= PEF Survey of Palestine =

1872–1877 and 1880 map surveys

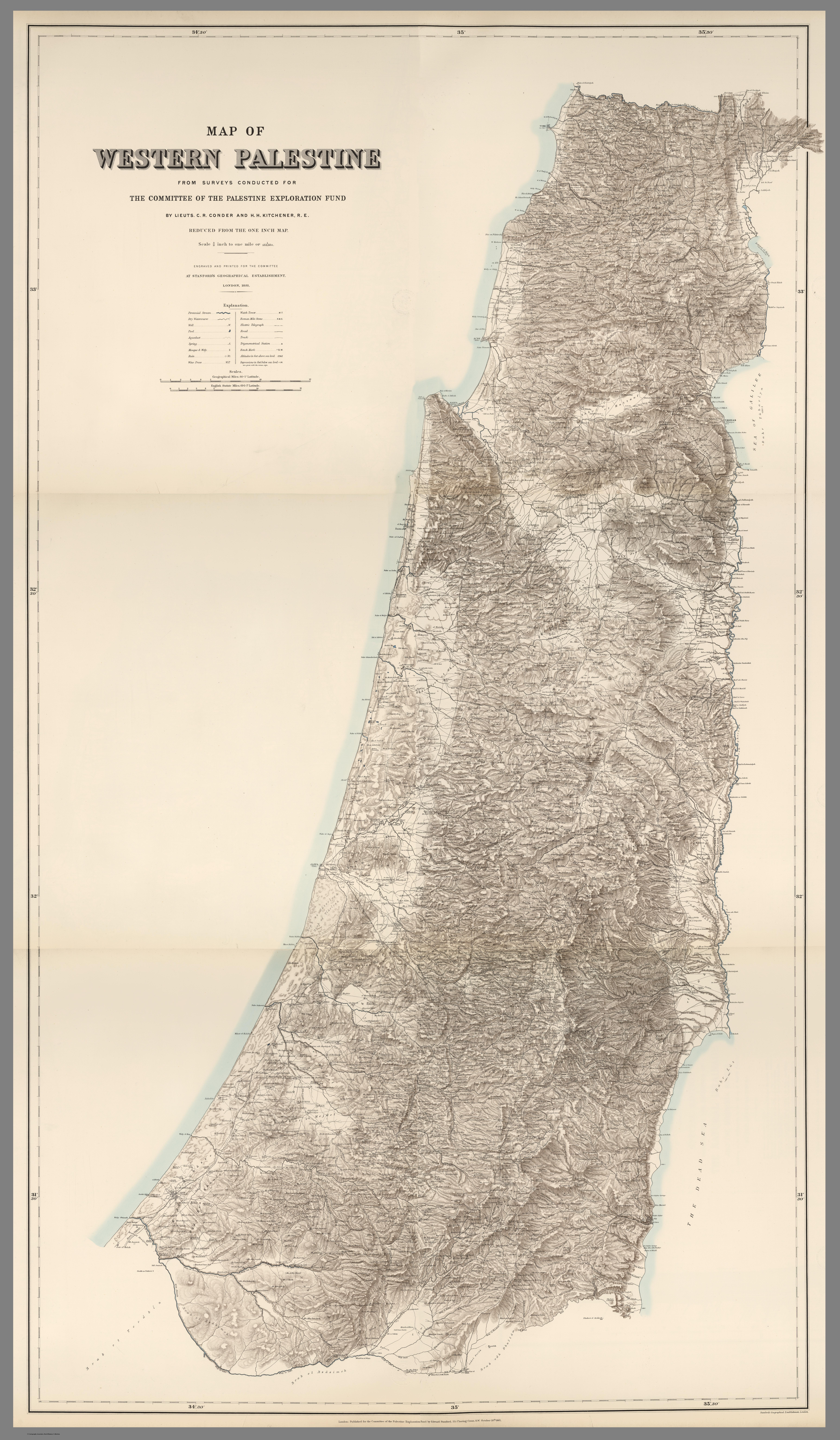
- Composite map of the 26 Western Palestine sheets
- Created: 1872–1880
- Location: The National Archives (United Kingdom)
- Author(s): Charles Wilson, Claude Reignier Conder, Herbert Kitchener, George Armstrong, and others

The PEF Survey of Palestine was a series of surveys carried out by the Palestine Exploration Fund (PEF) between 1872 and 1877 for the completed Survey of Western Palestine (SWP) and in 1880 for the soon abandoned Survey of Eastern Palestine. The survey was carried out after the success of the Ordnance Survey of Jerusalem by the newly-founded PEF, with support from the War Office. Twenty-six sheets were produced for "Western Palestine" and one sheet for "Eastern Palestine". It was the first fully scientific mapping of Palestine.

Besides being a geographic survey the group collected thousands of place names with the objective of identifying Biblical, Talmudic, early Christian and Crusading locations. The survey resulted in the publication of a map of Palestine consisting of 26 sheets, at a scale of 1:63,360, the most detailed and accurate map of Palestine published in the 19th century. The PEF survey represented the peak of the cartographic work in Palestine in the nineteenth century.

Although the holiness of Palestine was a significant motivator for many members of the PEF, the allocation of British Army Royal Engineers to carry out the survey was a result of British strategic interests, particularly the proximity of the Suez Canal.

Palestinian writer Nur Masalha posited that the popularity of the publications led to a growth in Zionism amongst Jews.

It was the most influential and reliable map of Palestine until the British Mandate's Survey of Palestine, which began half a century later.

== War Office involvement ==
As a result of the French survey work in Galilee in 1870, Charles Wilson joined the Topographical Department of the Intelligence Department of the War Office in London. In addition, the outbreak of the Russo-Turkish War (1877–1878) provided another strategic imperative for the British Government to ensure the completion of the survey work. Colonel Home of the British War Office wrote in May 1877: "If Russia occupies Turkish Armenia she will have the two valleys of the Euphrates and Tigris at her disposal and she will completely dominate the Gulf of Seuderum if indeed she does not occupy it. Syria especially the Valley of the Jordan will become of great importance as offering the easiest road for an advance on the Suez Canal—under such circumstances it is of the utmost importance that we should have good maps of the country."

John James Moscrop illustrated the nature of the involvement of the War Office in the survey work, in a detailed monograph. The success of the survey resulted from the War Office providing support to the PEF, and the PEF providing cover to the War Office. Haim Goren's review summarized it as follows:

Moscrop takes considerable pains to show how the different governmental bodies, particularly the War Office, were involved in all stages of the Survey of Western Palestine. He shows how Wilson was in practice serving as liaison between the government and the Palestine Exploration Fund's Executive Committee, of which he was a member. ... He also describes how general publication of the maps and memoirs was held back until the War Office had finished with them for its own purposes. Finally, Moscrop re-examines the payments made by the Fund to those involved in the survey. Revealingly, he finds that for most of the relevant period there is no mention of any payments for the salaries of the Royal Engineers. It has to be supposed that the money came from a quite different source-that from which the men's salaries had always come, namely the War Office in London.

The "Survey of Eastern Palestine" was abandoned partly due to a change of priority for the British Government, who became focused on the events building up to the British Conquest of Egypt (1882). Moscrop writes: "The abandonment of the Eastern Survey does demonstrate the close linkage between the War Office, the Intelligence Department, and the Fund and the fact that this survey like its predecessor, the Western Survey, was not an independent survey run by the fund."

== The surveys ==
The majority of the work of the survey was carried out by the Royal Engineers. In addition to the extensive maps, the Palestine Exploration Fund published three copious volumes of the field work conducted by Conder and Kitchener, known as The Survey of Western Palestine (Memoirs of the Topography, Orography, Hydrography, and Archæology), wherein are detailed accounts of every hill range, stream, spring, village, town, ruin, and large buildings in Palestine, as also notes of every statement as to topography gathered by C.R. Conder from Jewish, Samaritan, Greek, Latin, and Norman French notices of Palestine, with contributions touching on the topography of Palestine found in Josephus, the Bible, Pliny, Strabo, the Rabbinical writers, the Samaritan chroniclers, the Onomasticon, the early Christian pilgrims, and the Crusading and Arab chronicles. A fourth work published by E.H. Palmer, and which includes Arabic nomenclature collected by Conder and Kitchener for the PEF, is The Survey of Western Palestine - Arabic and English Name Lists.

=== Jerusalem survey and excavations ===
The PEF surveyors, led by Charles Warren, carried out survey and excavation work in Jerusalem between spring 1867 and April 1870, building on the 1864-65 Ordnance Survey of Jerusalem.

During his three periods of residence in the region (1865–72, 1873–74 and 1881–82), Charles Simon Clermont-Ganneau led a few discrete pieces of survey work that were carried out for and published by the PEF.

=== Western Palestine survey ===
The initial survey group arrived in Jaffa in early November 1871 led by Captain Richard Warren Stewart and including a surveyor named George Armstrong; Charles Francis Tyrwhitt-Drake joined the group on 17 December, around which time Captain Stewart fell ill and returned to Britain. 23 year-old Lieutenant Claude Reignier Conder joined to lead the group on 17 July 1872, prior to which 560 square miles (1,500 km^{2}) had been surveyed.

An aggregate total of 1,250 square miles (3,200 km^{2}) had been surveyed by the end of December 1872, 1,800 by 8 June 1873, 2,300 square miles (6,000 km^{2}) by 22 January 1874, and 3,000 by 23 April 1874. Tyrwhitt-Drake died from fever (thought to be malaria) on 23 June 1874, and on 19 Nov 1874, 24 year-old Lieutenant Herbert Kitchener joined to replace him.

3,500 square miles (9,100 km^{2}) had been surveyed by 8 December 1874, and 4,700 by 30 June 1875. The survey was suspended for 15 months following an incident in July 1875 when its members were attacked near Safad by a group of Algerians. Kitchener returned to the region, completing the remainder of the survey between 27 February 1877 and 27 September, with a total surveyed area of 6,040 square miles (15,600 km^{2}).

=== Eastern Palestine survey ===
The survey was carried out between August and October 1881 by a team led by Captain Conder. They surveyed 510 square miles (1,300 km^{2}) of barely populated land, covering an area which included Amman, then an almost uninhabited set of Roman ruins, and the recently repopulated Madaba.

== Leadership ==
The survey was led at different times by four senior Royal Engineers:

- Captain Wilson (later Col. Sir Charles Wilson, who in 1885 led the final stage of the Nile Expedition);
- Captain Warren (later General Sir Charles Warren, who in 1888 was the Commissioner of the London Police Force during the Jack the Ripper murder investigation);
- Lieutenant Conder (later Colonel Conder, who became a prolific author on Ancient Middle Eastern history, and almost a century after his death was accused of being Jack the Ripper); and
- Lieutenant Kitchener (later Field Marshal Lord Kitchener, and the British Secretary of State for War at the beginning of World War I, famously depicted in the Lord Kitchener Wants You poster).

== Gallery ==
=== Composite maps ===
Key to 26 maps

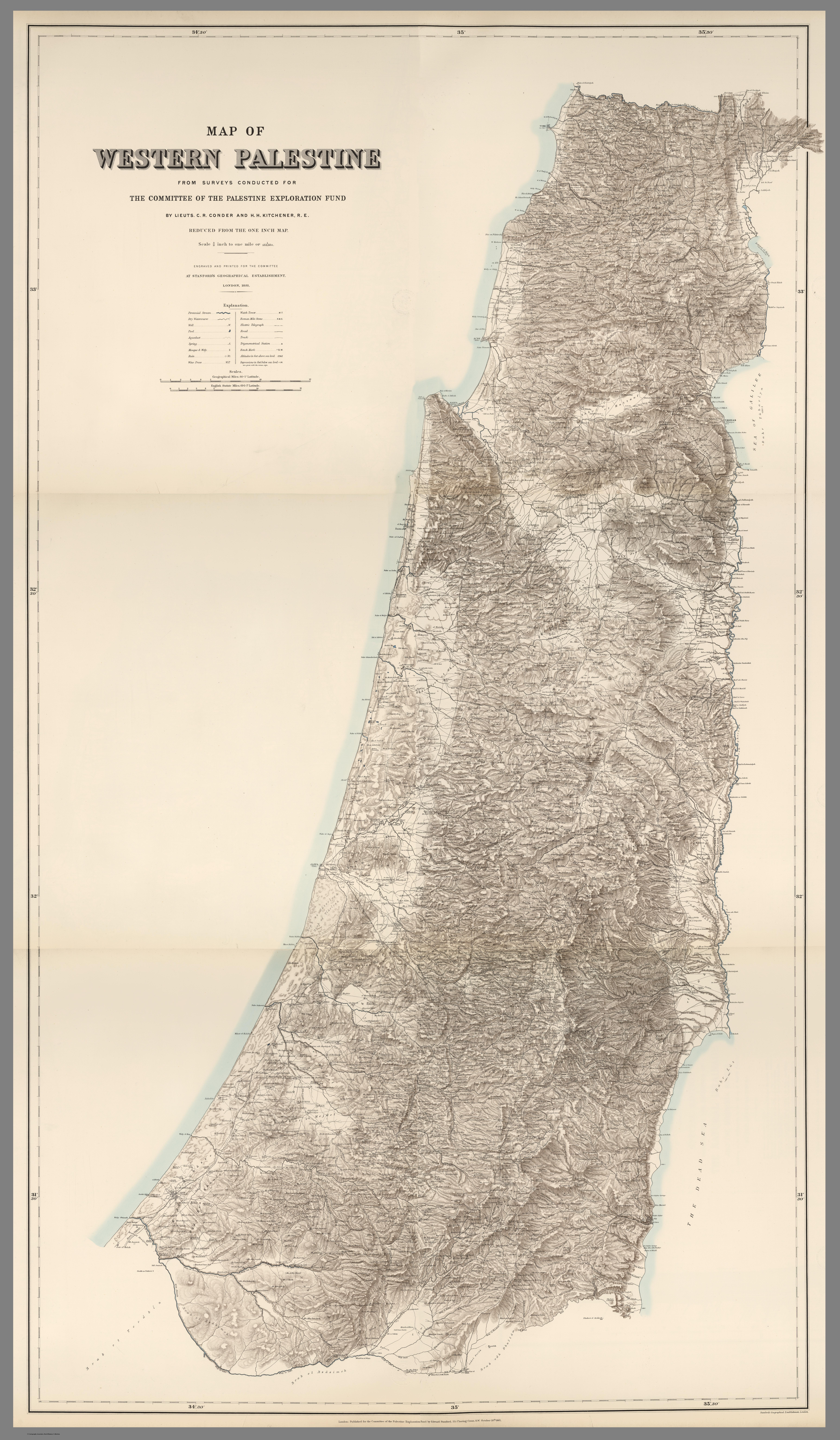
Composite map

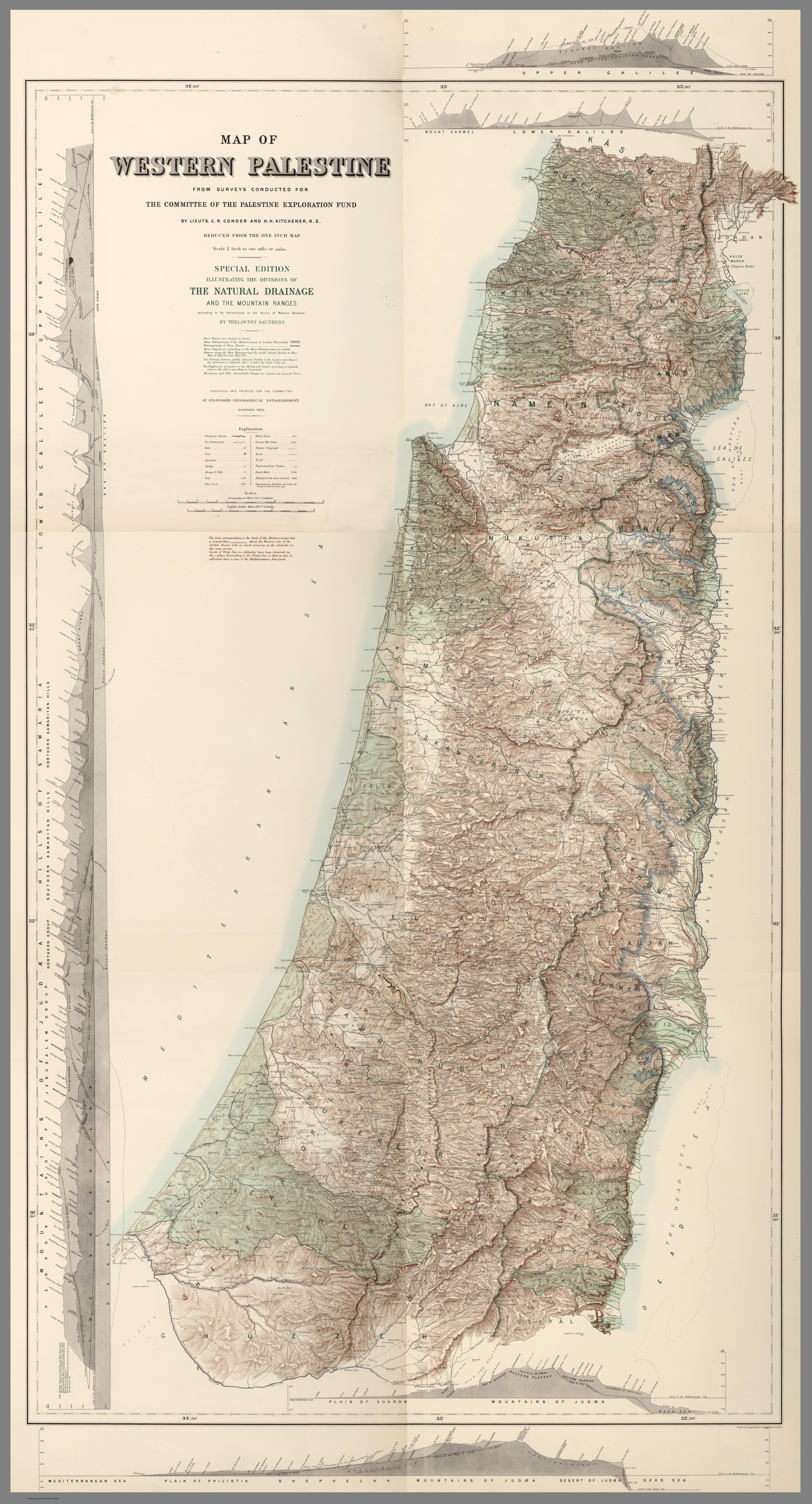
Natural Drainage and Mountain Ranges

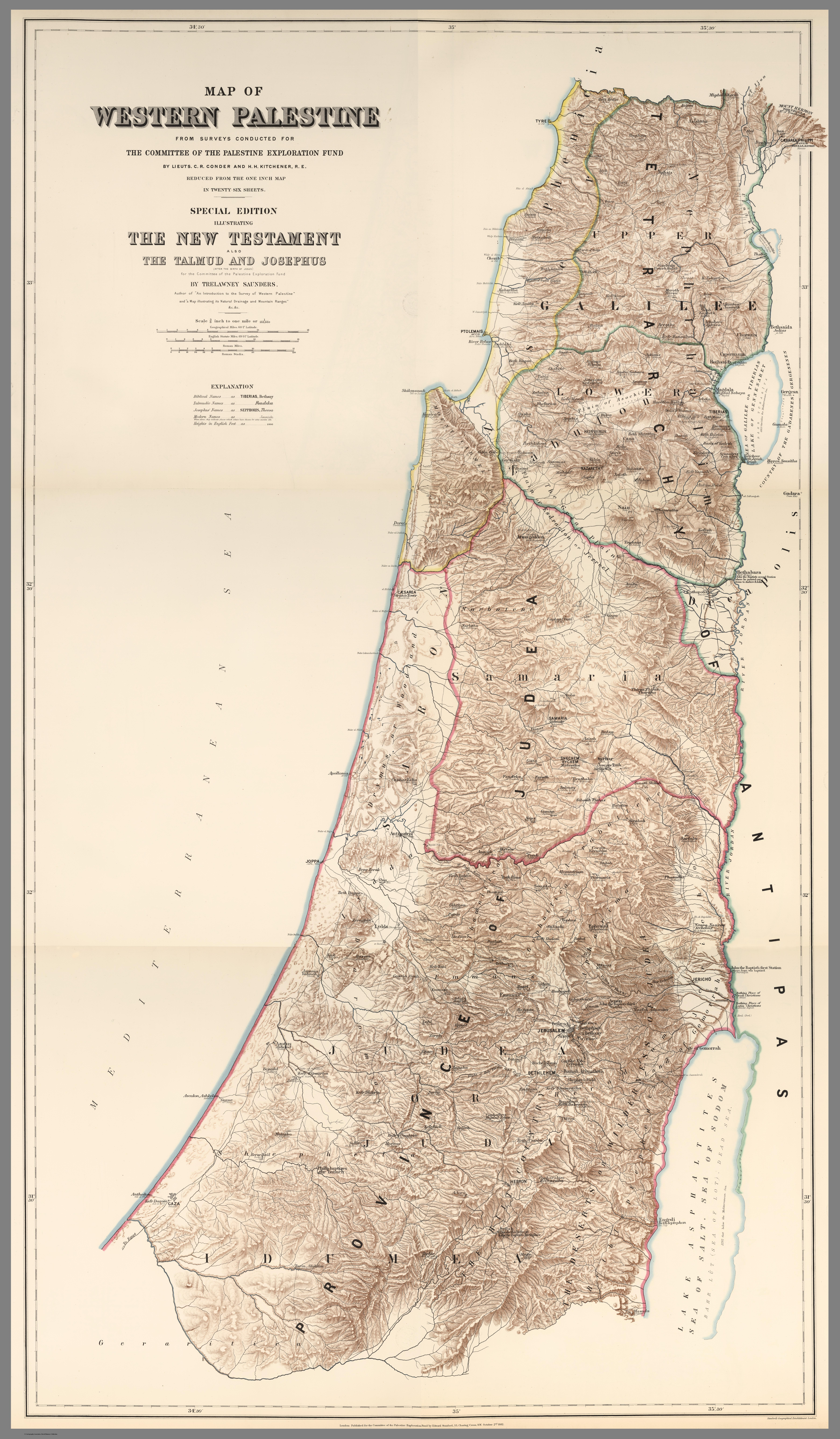
New Testament

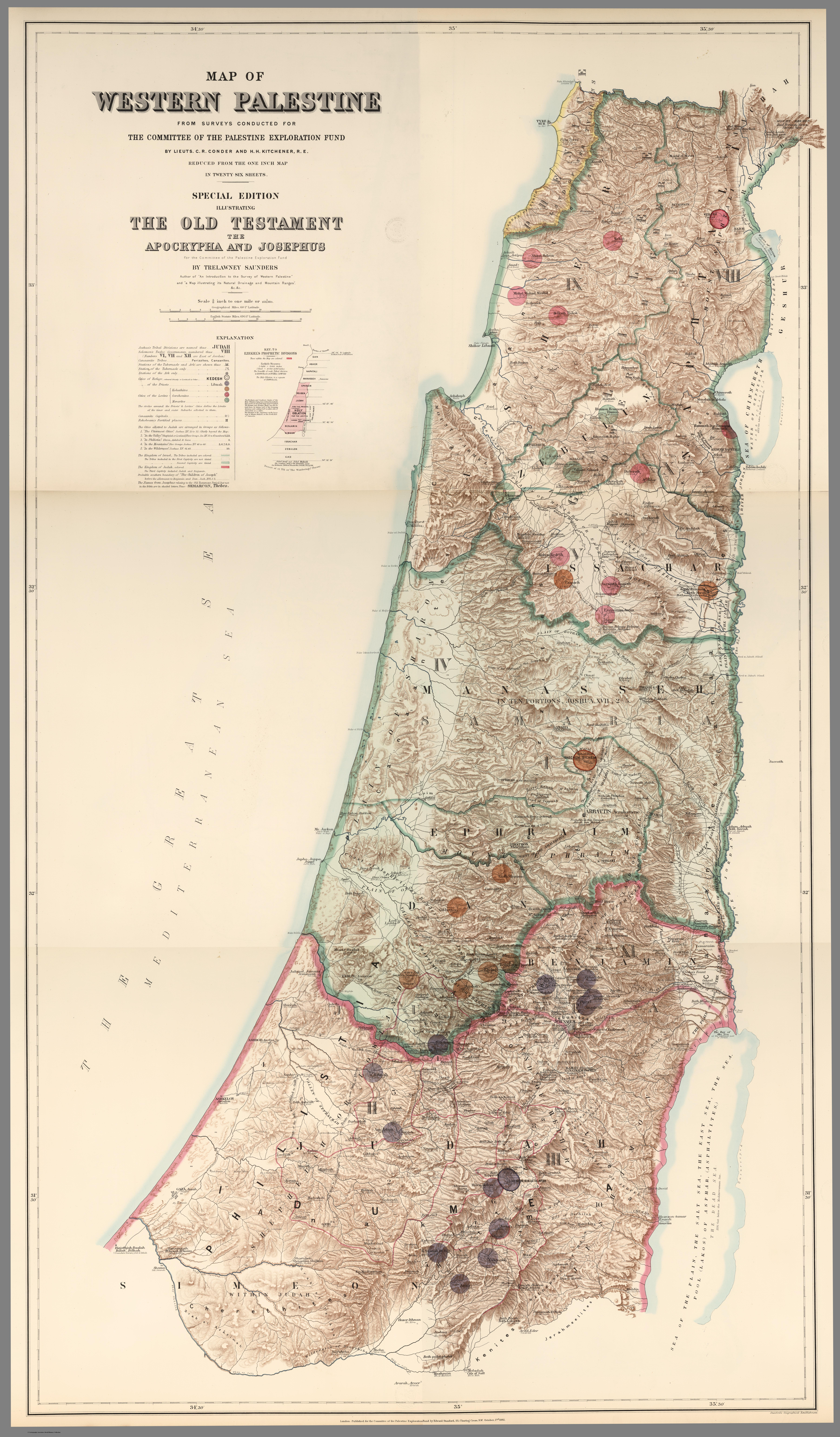
Old Testament

=== 26 Maps of Western Palestine ===
The twenty-six sheets of the map

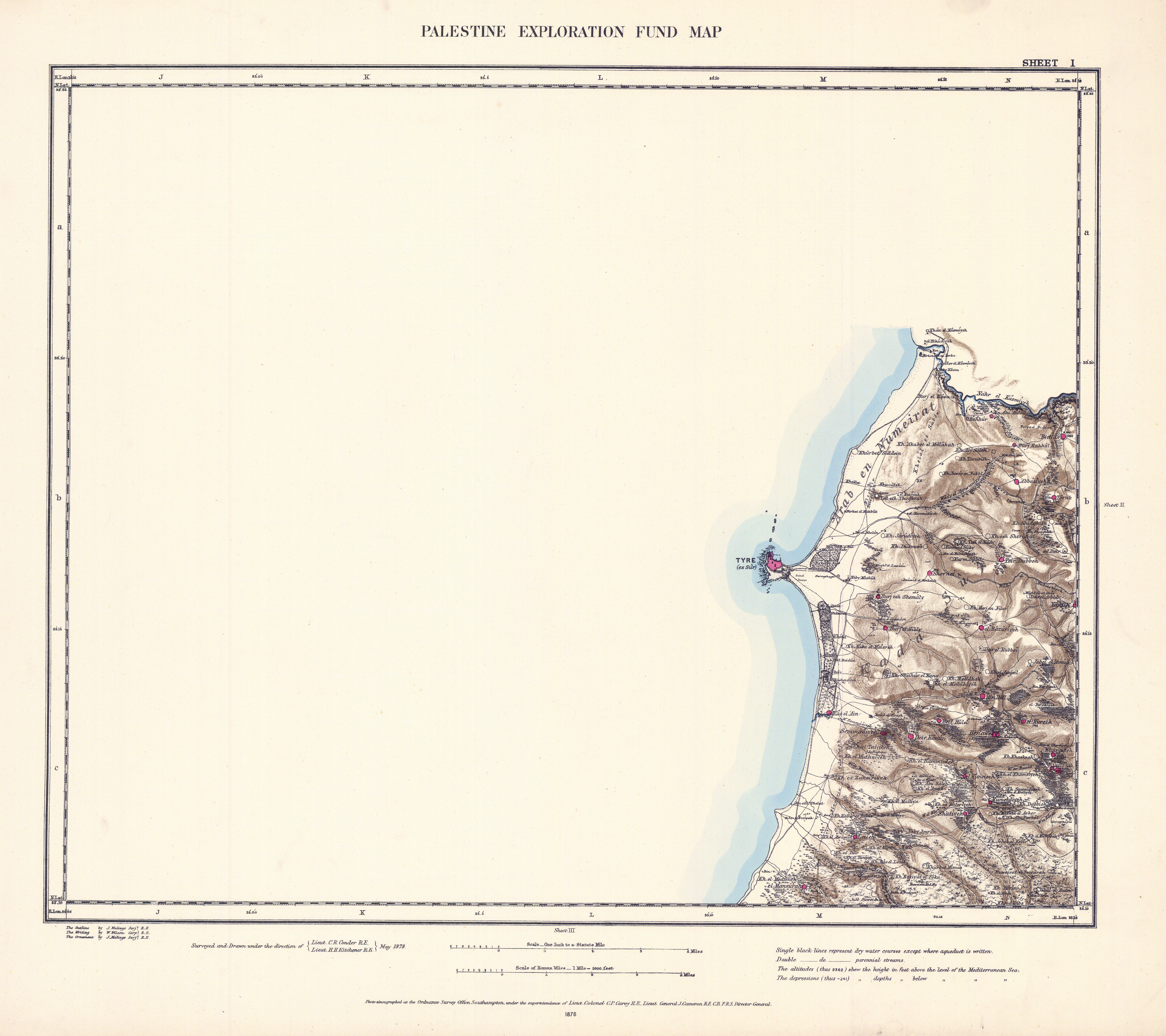
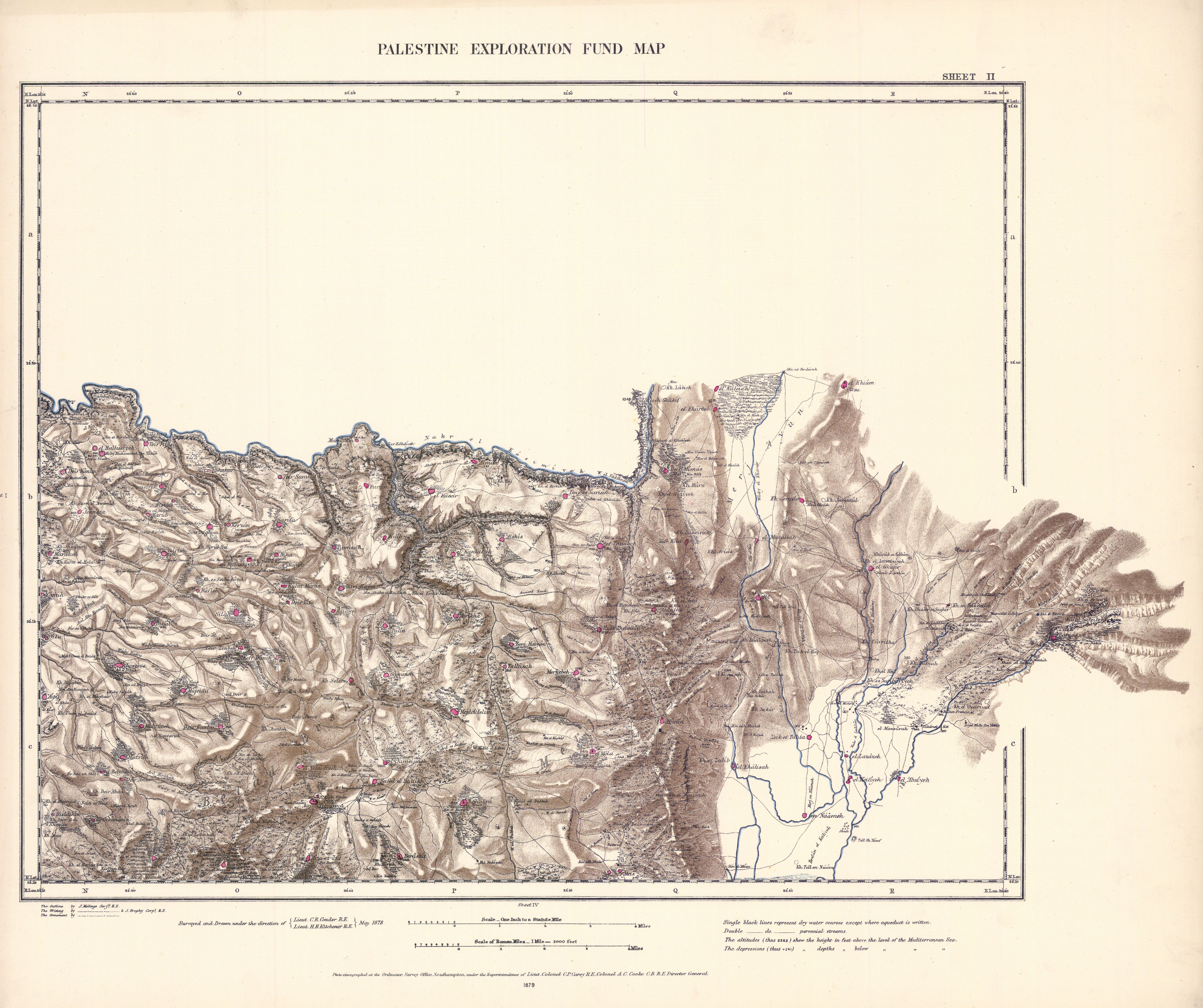
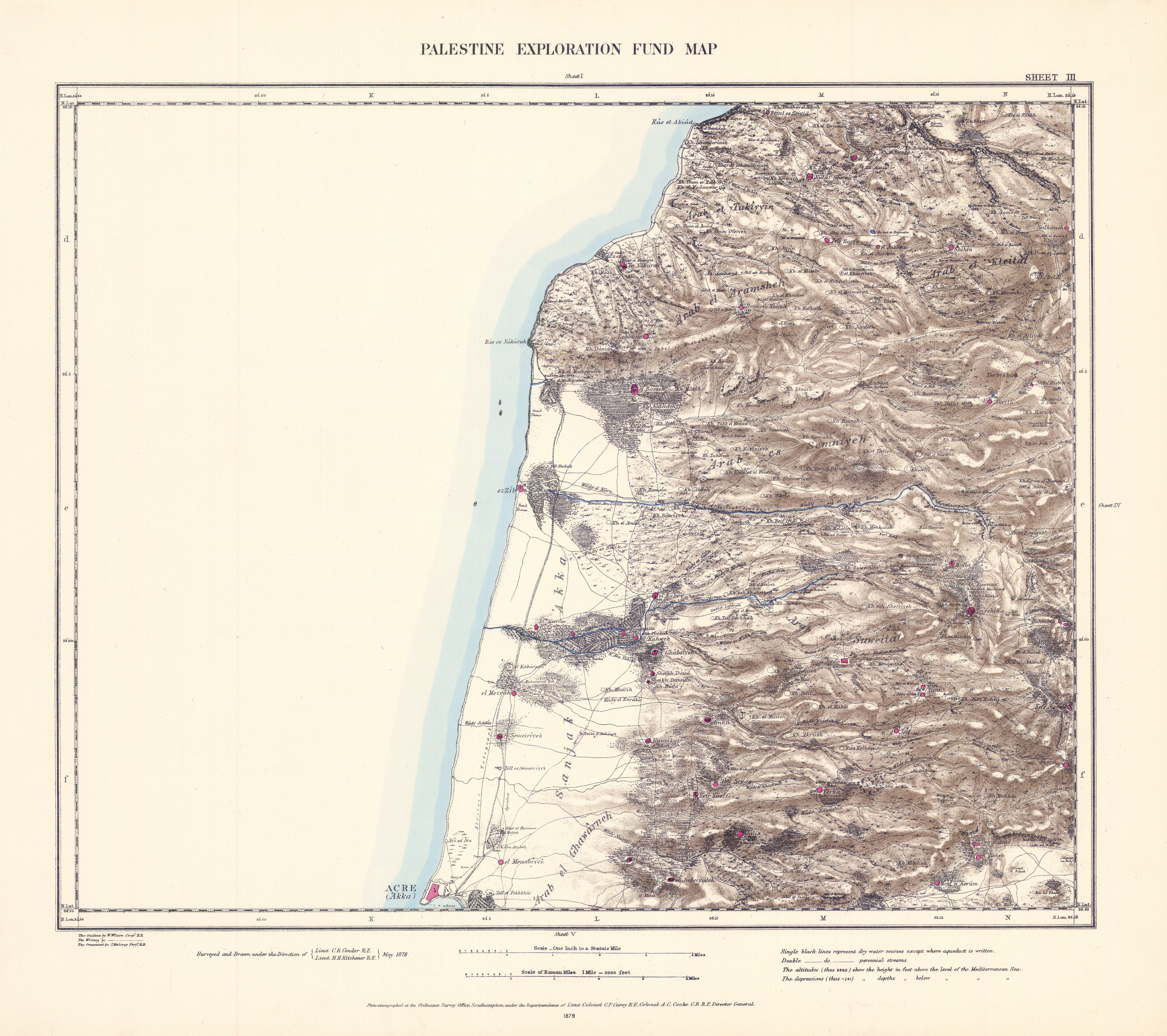
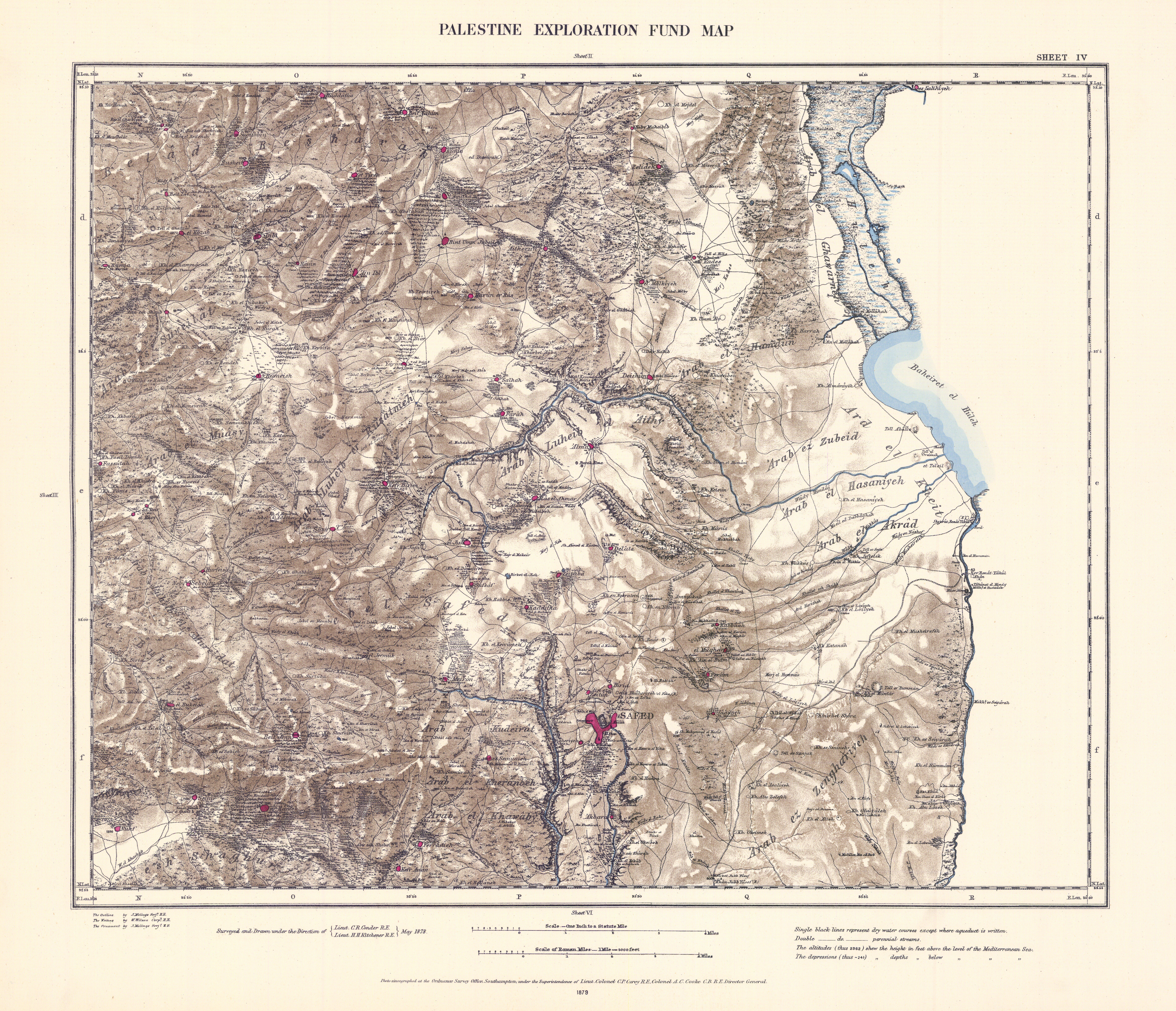
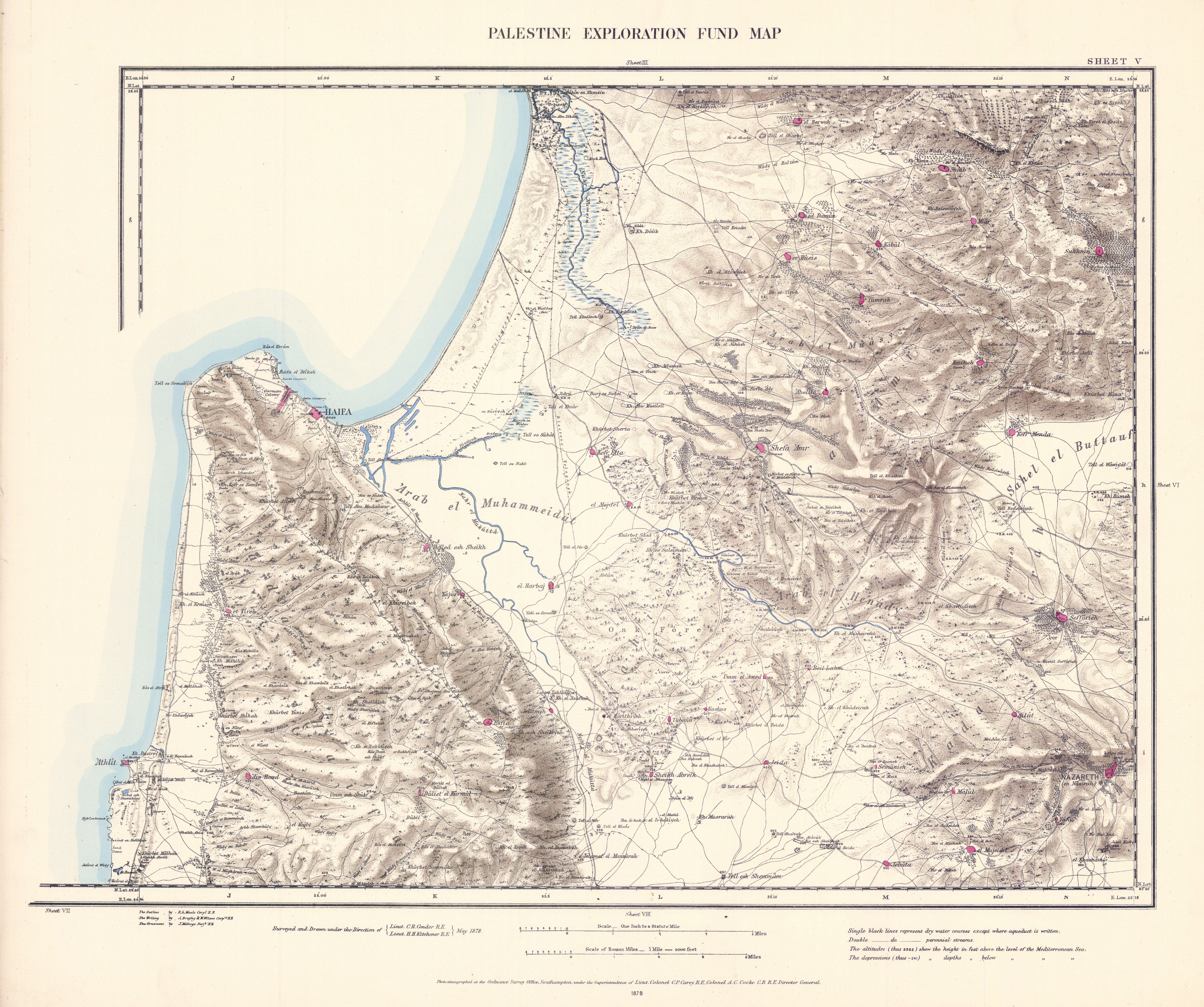
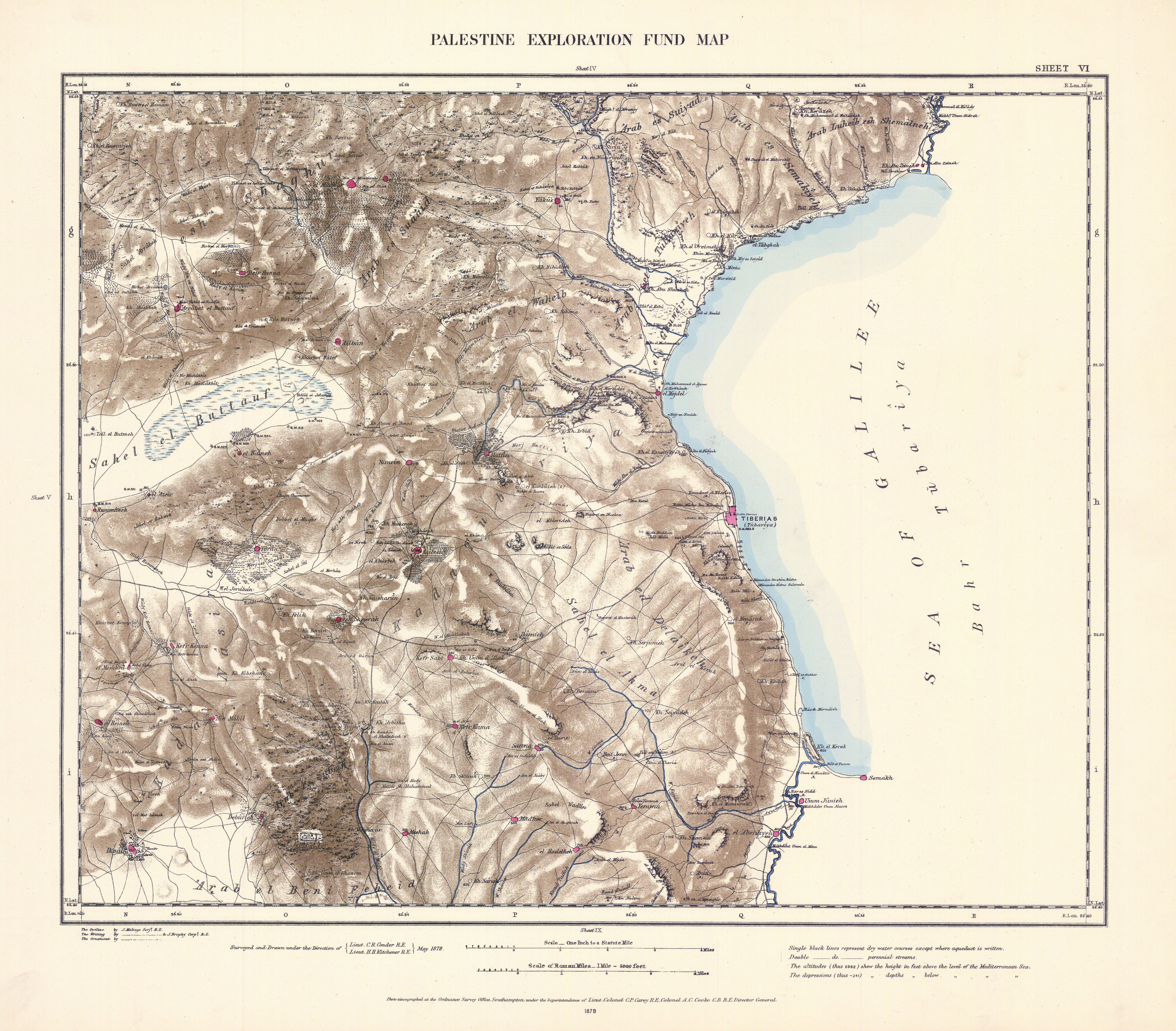
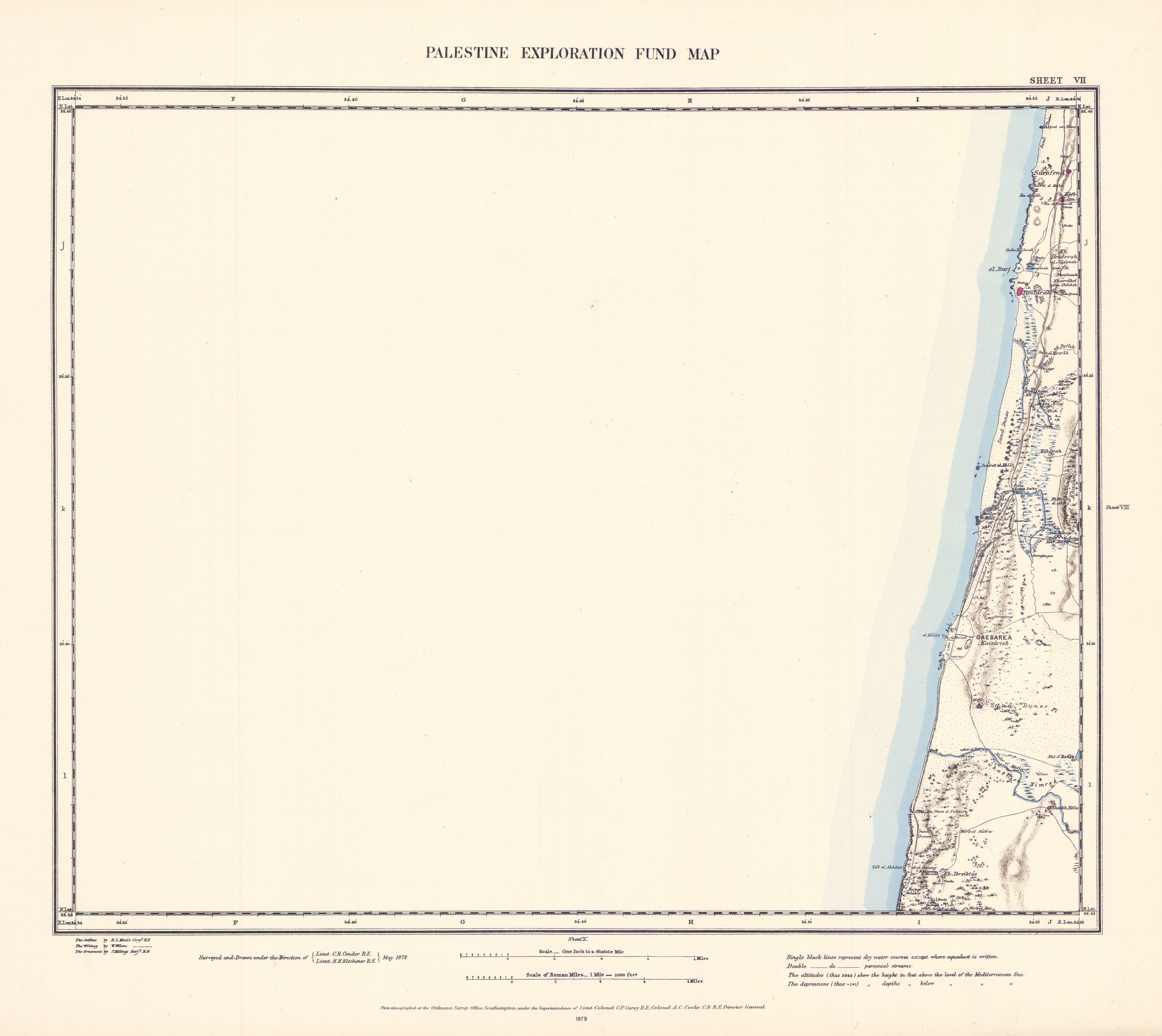
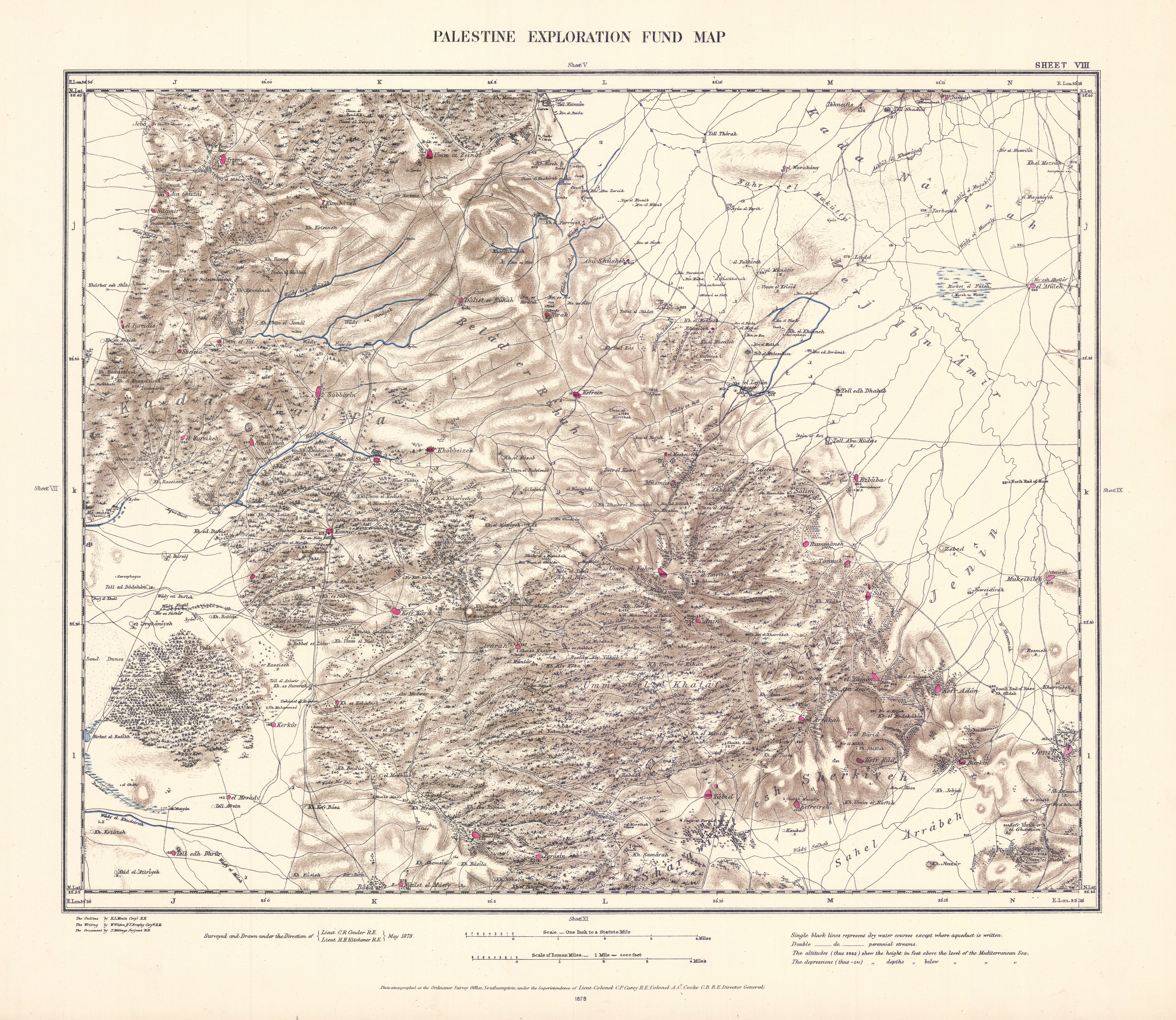
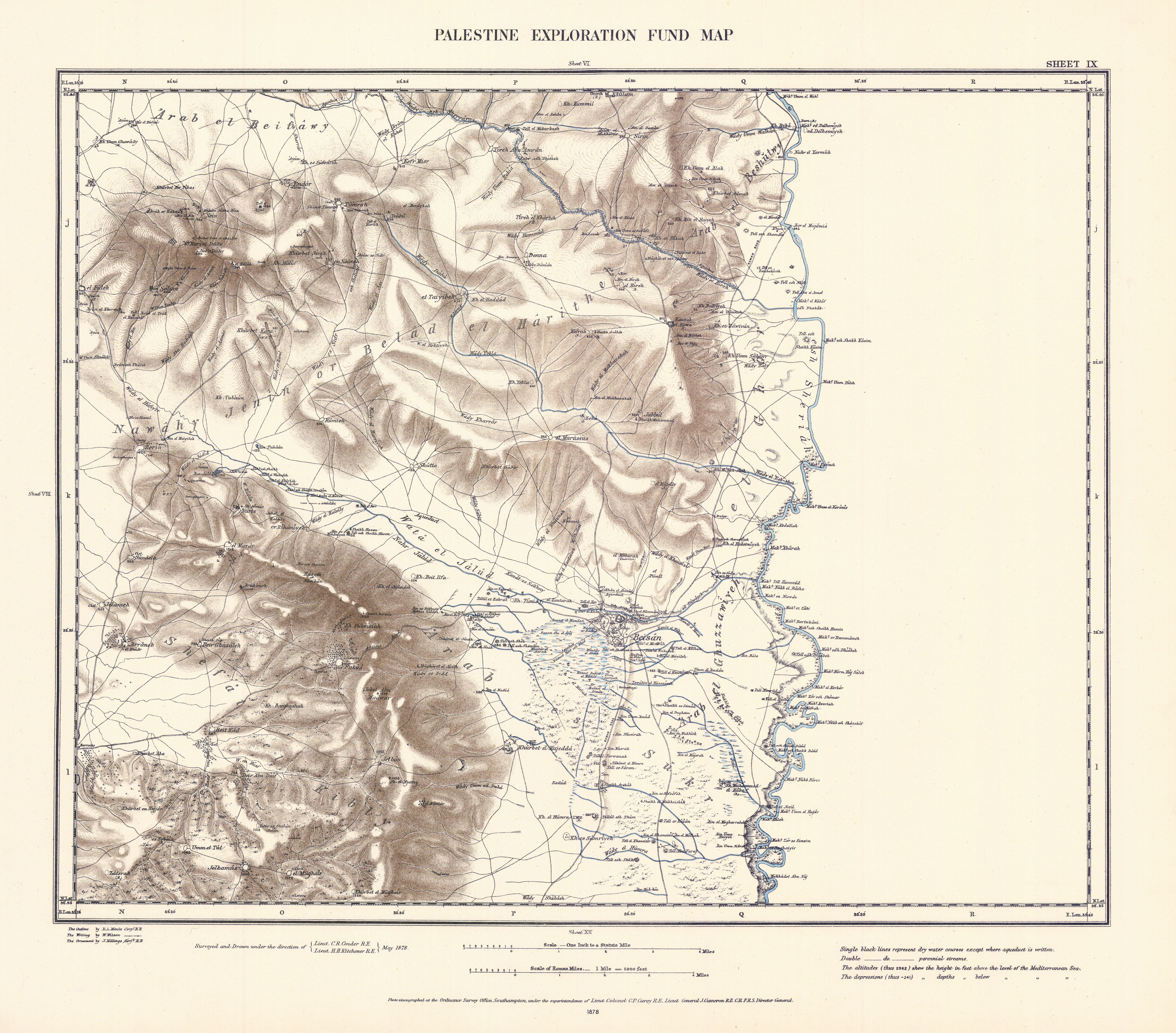
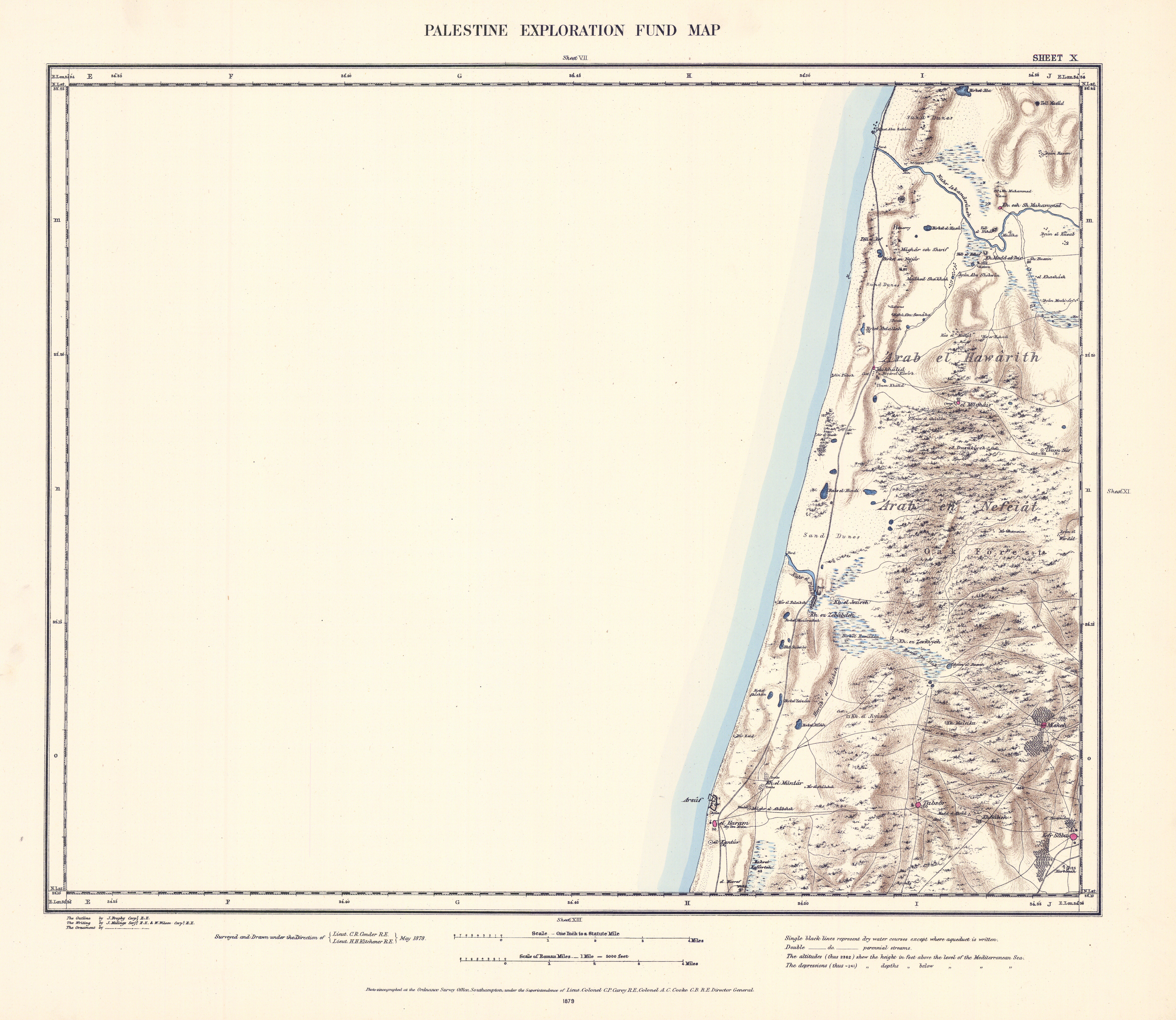
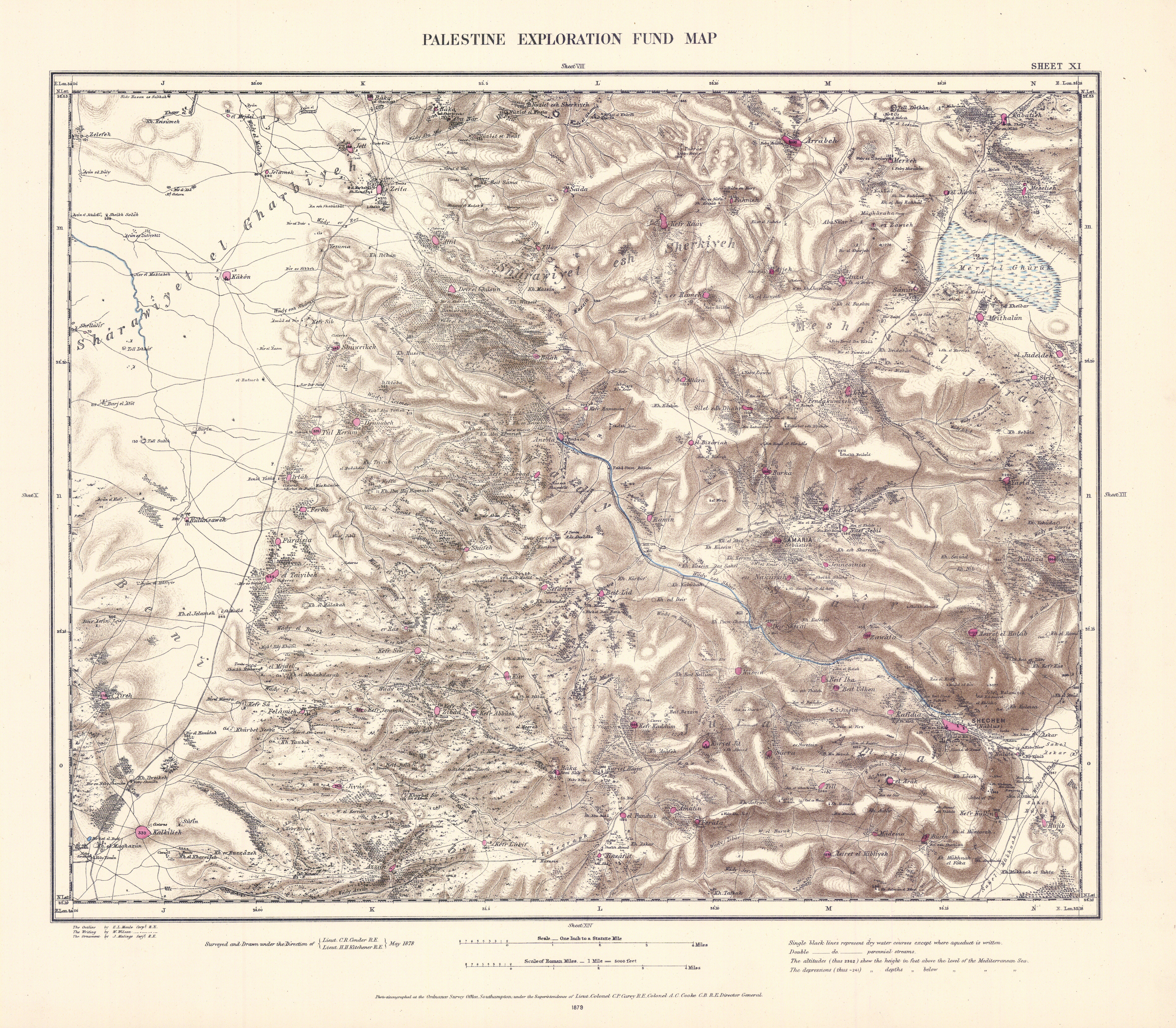
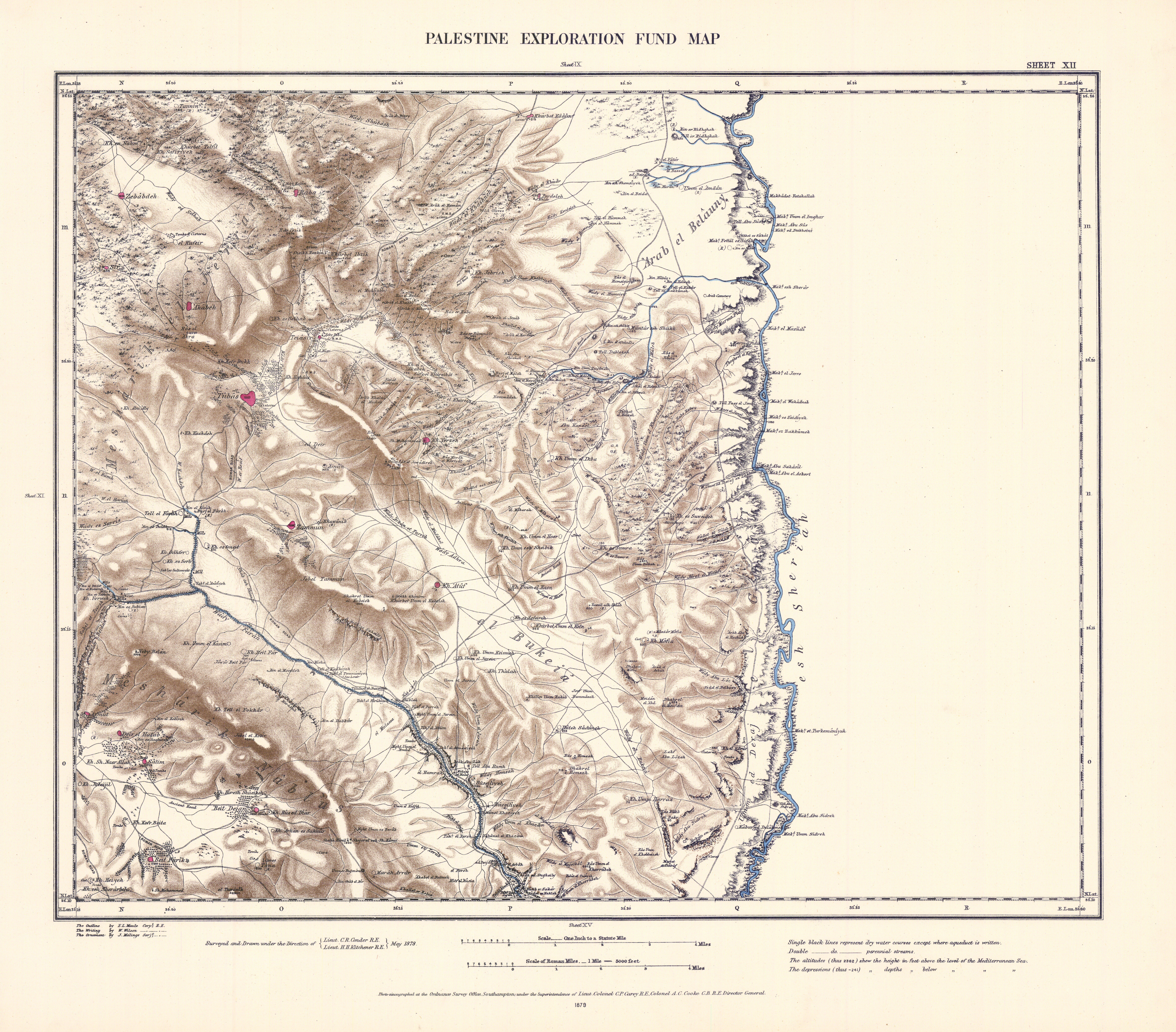
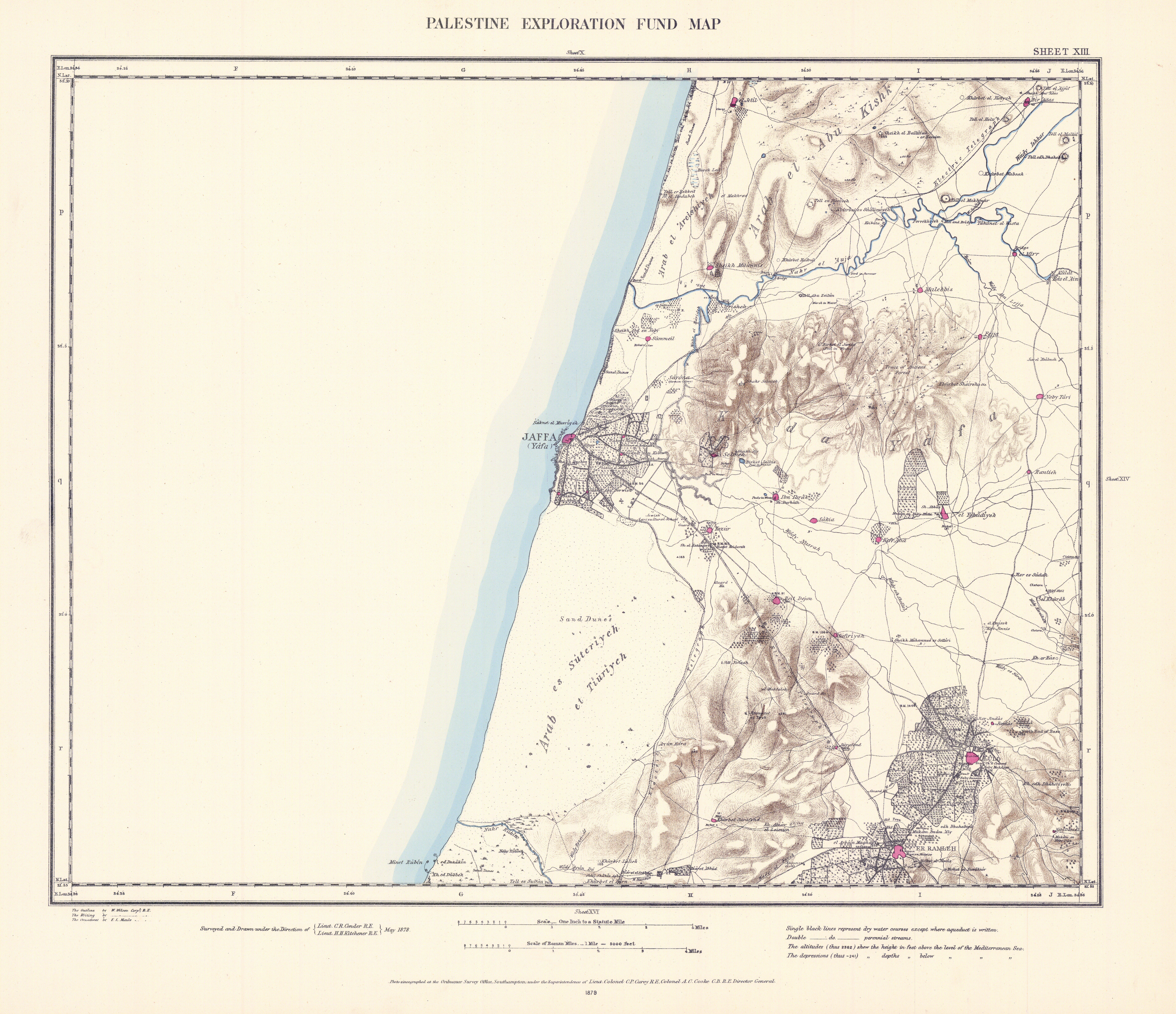
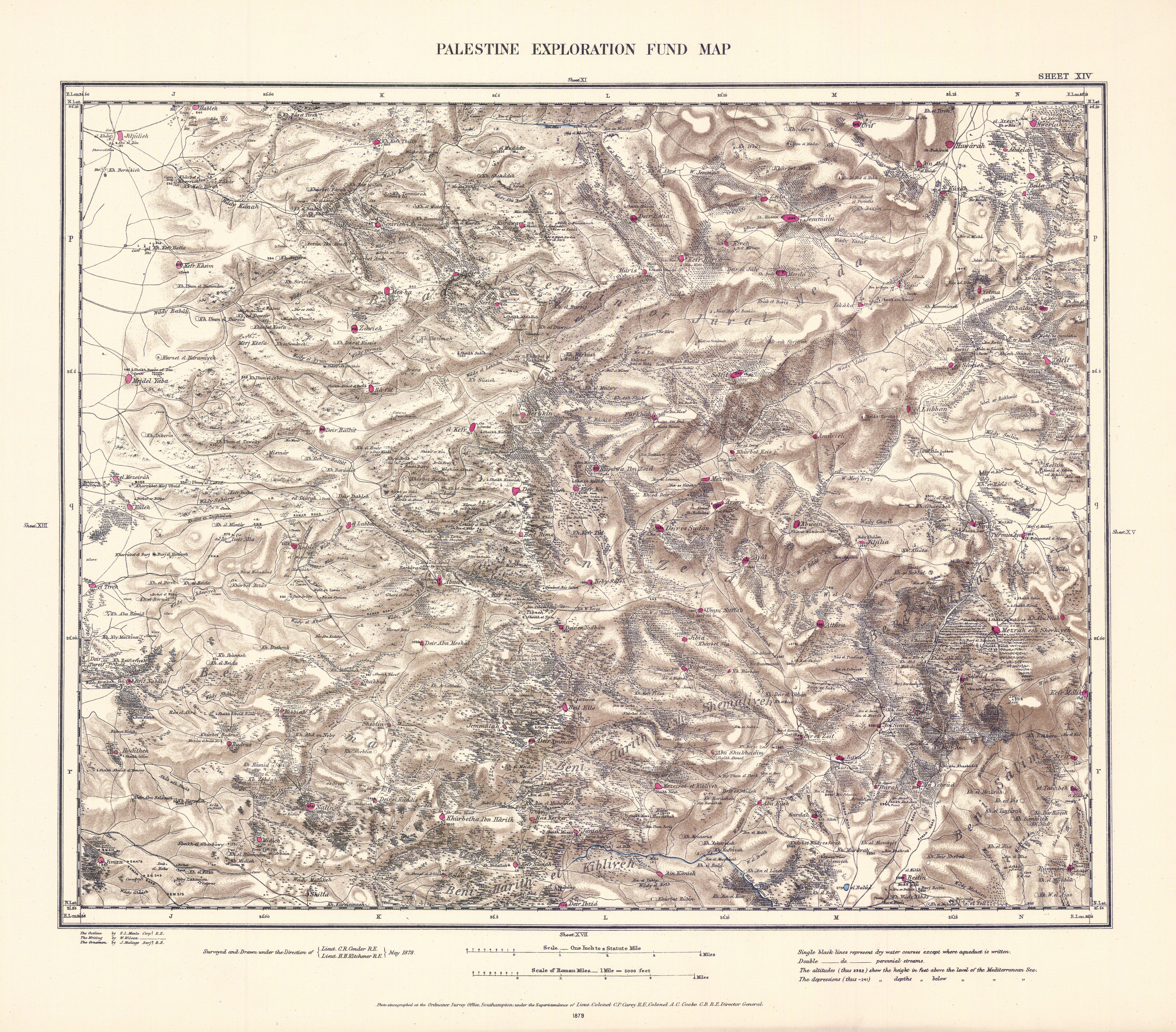
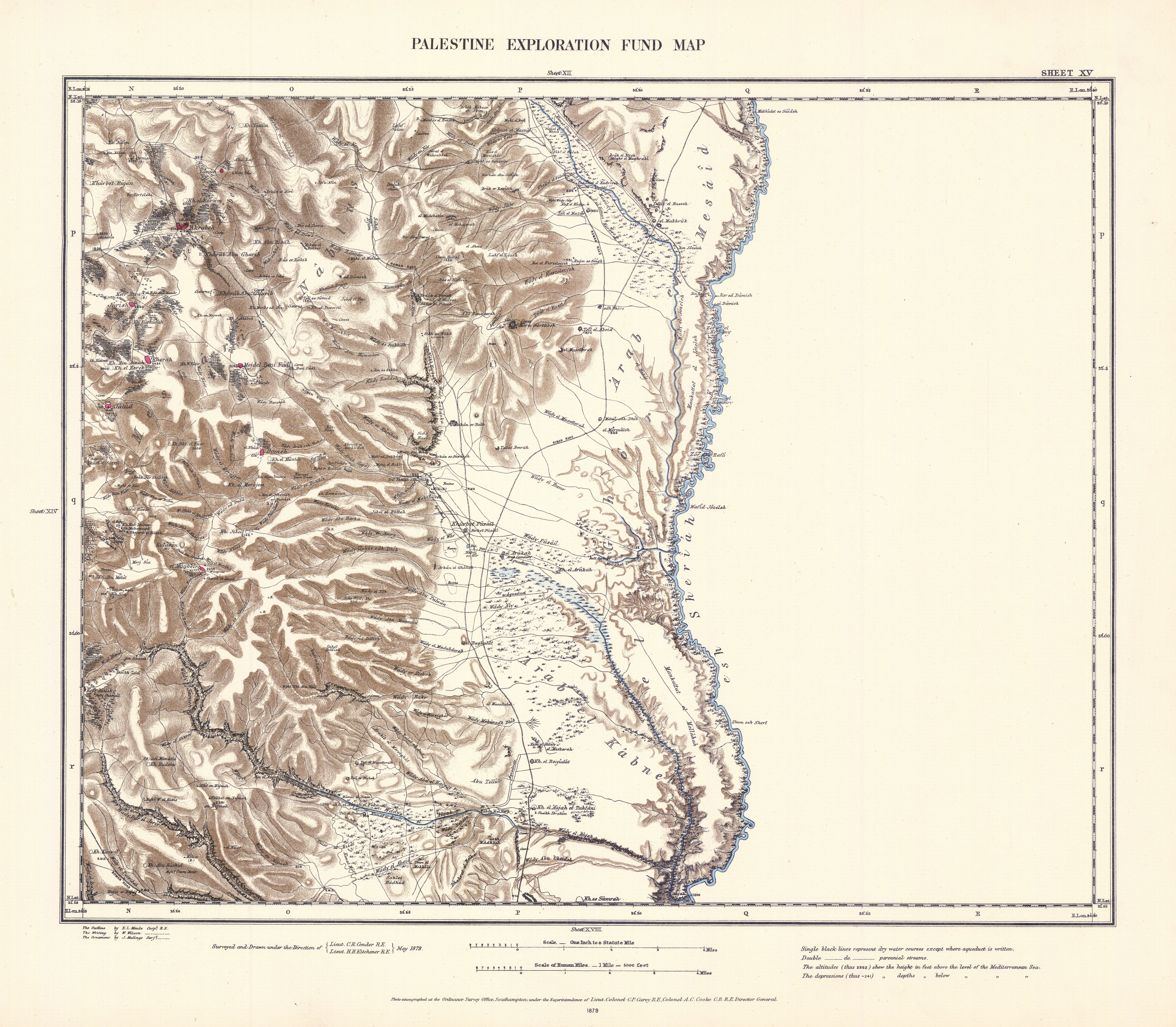
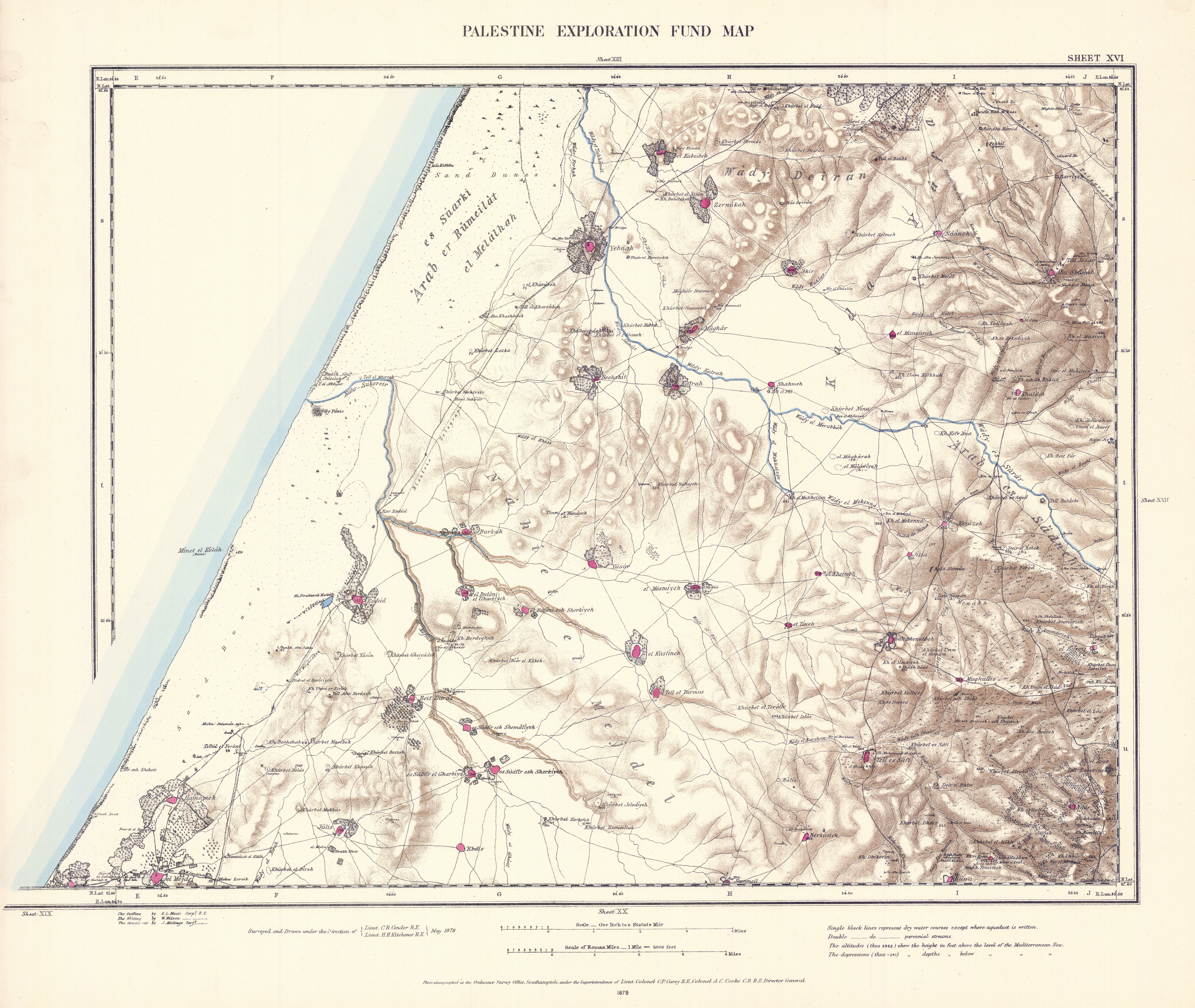
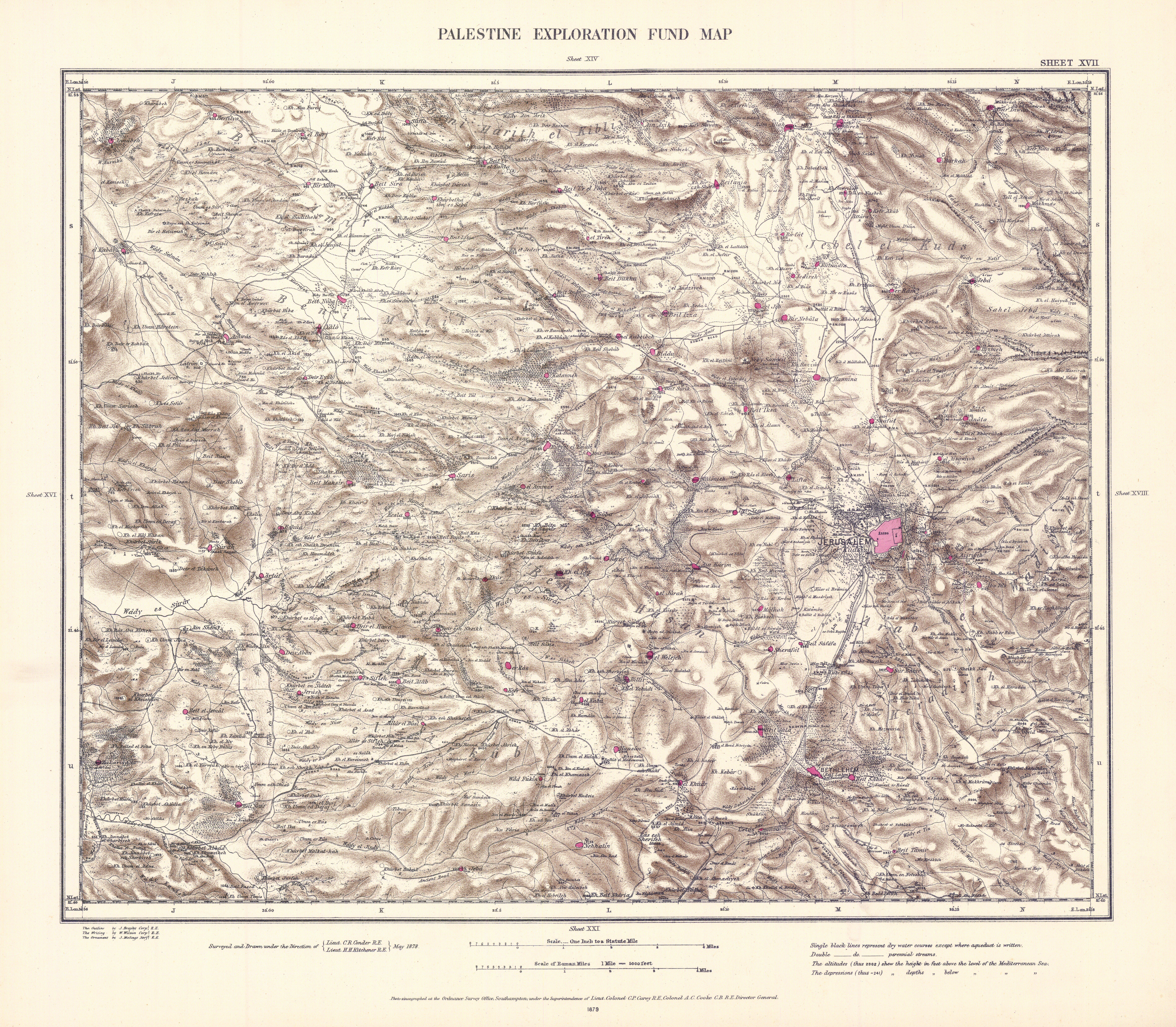
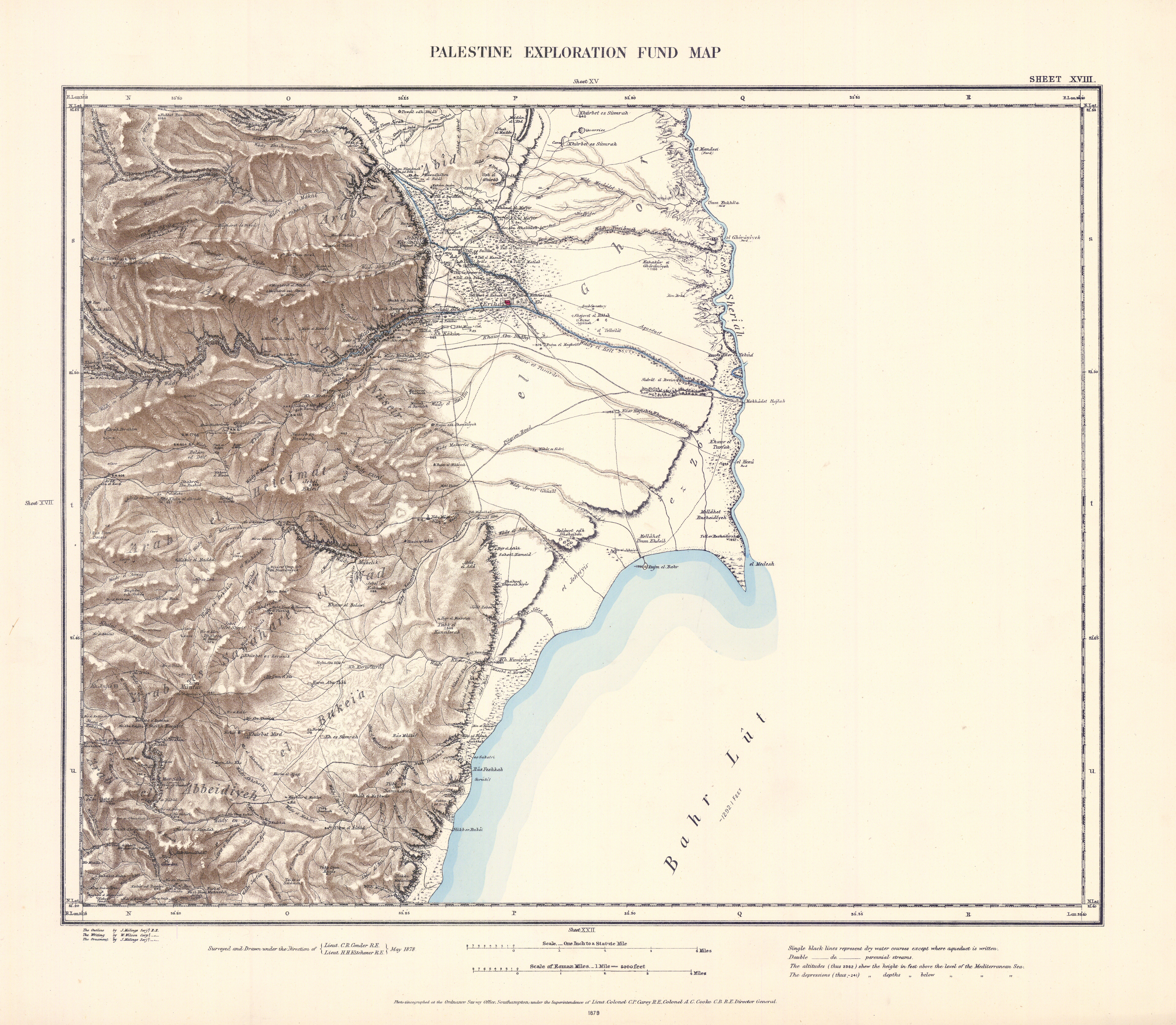
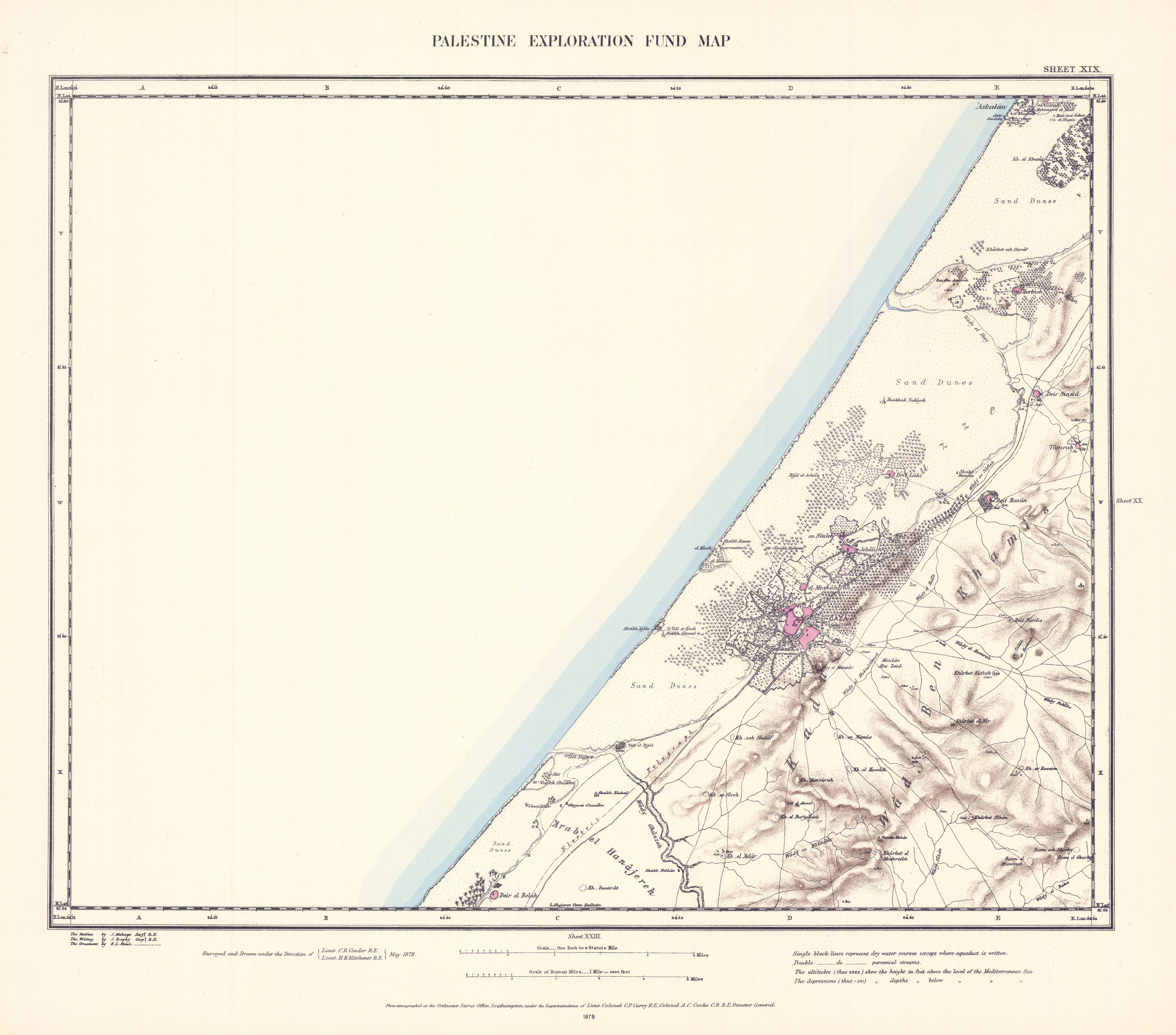
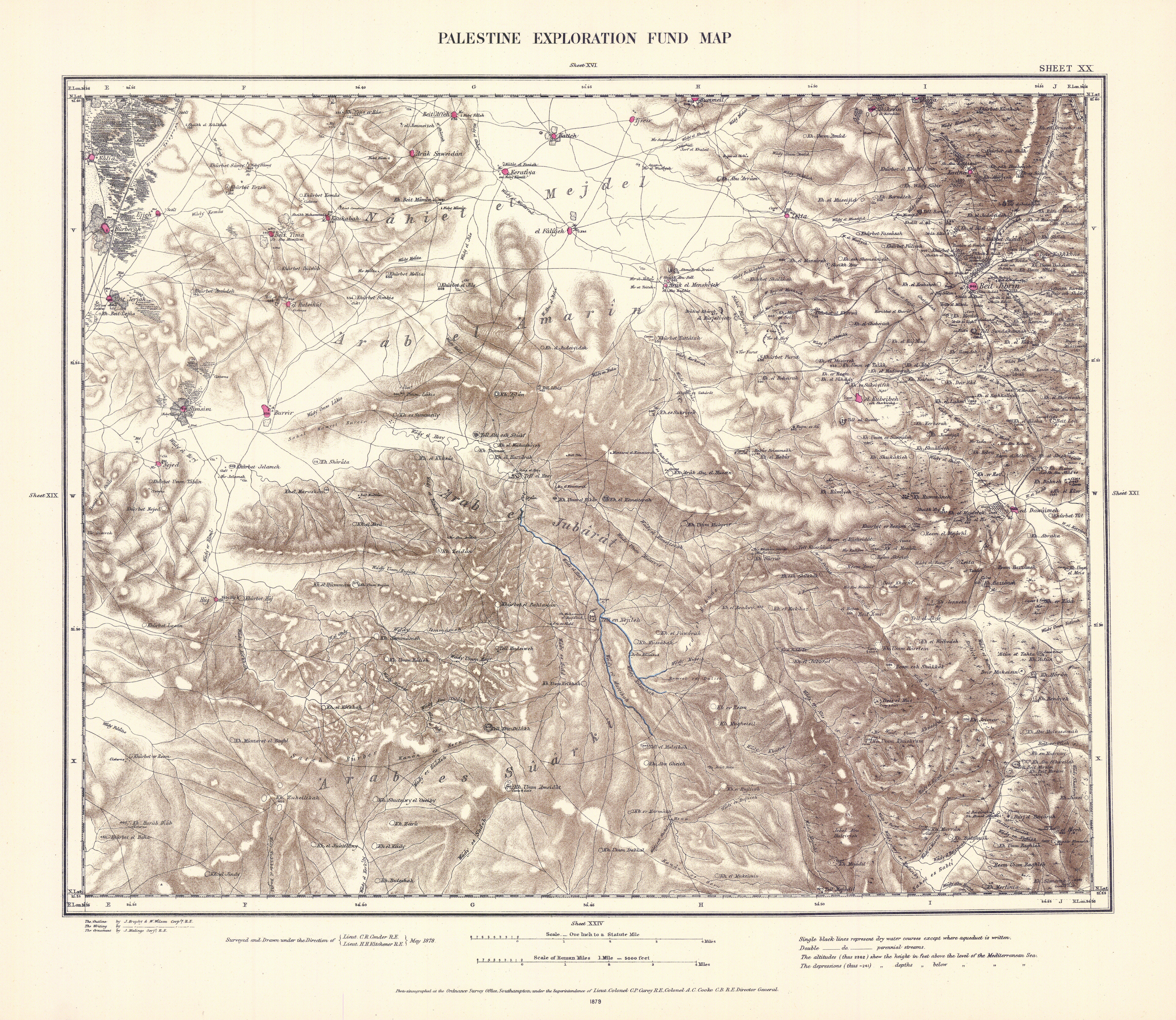
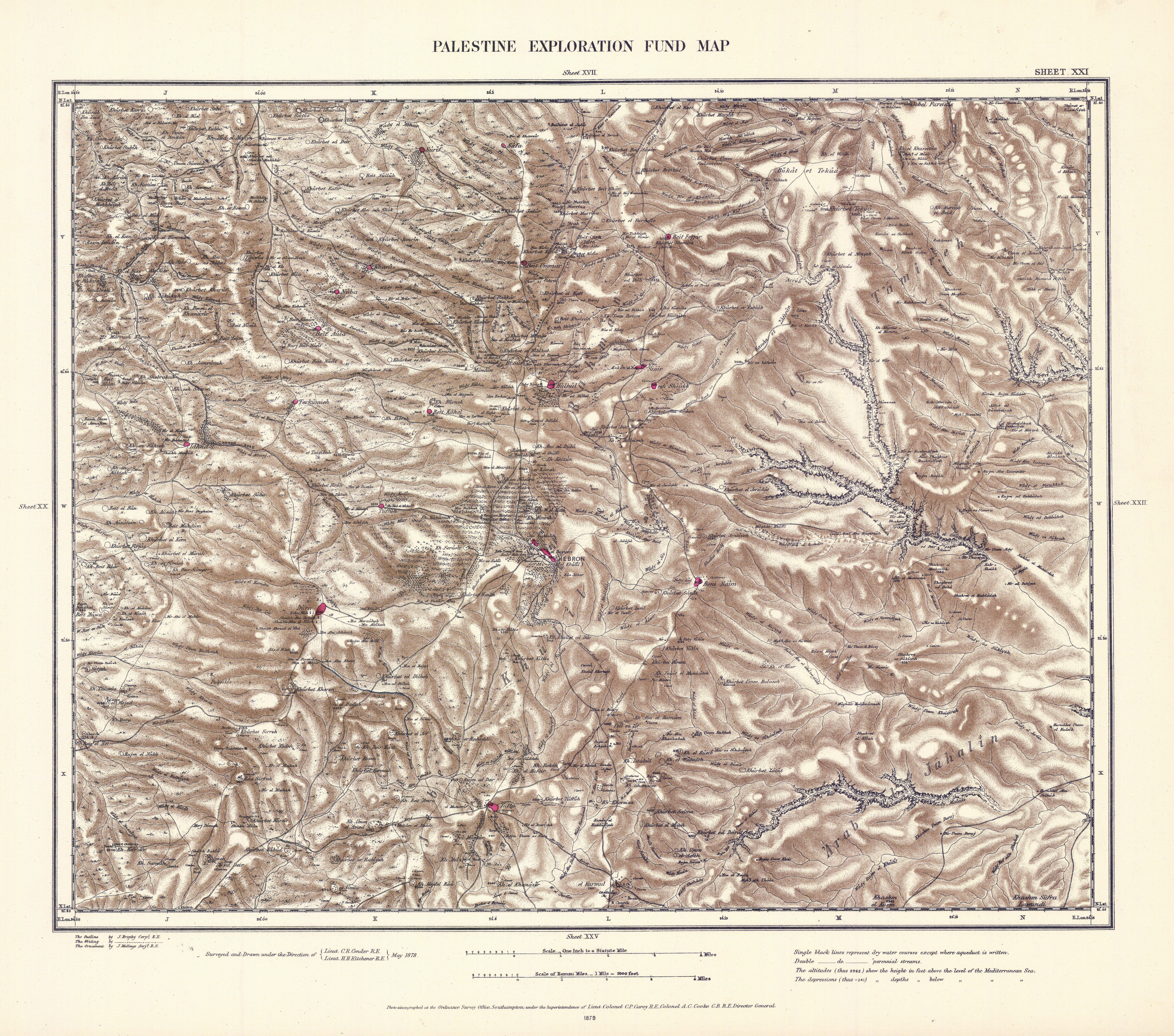
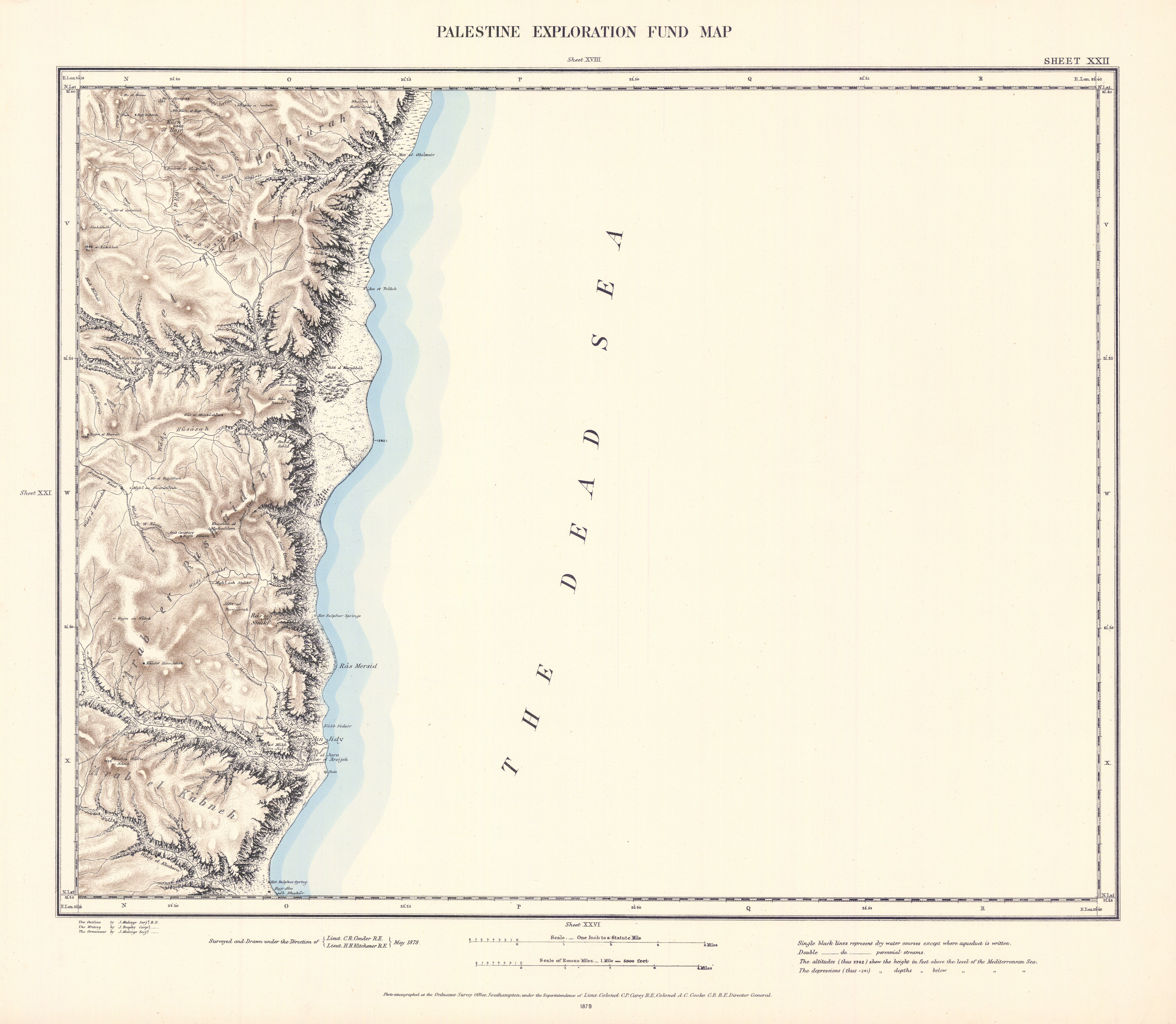
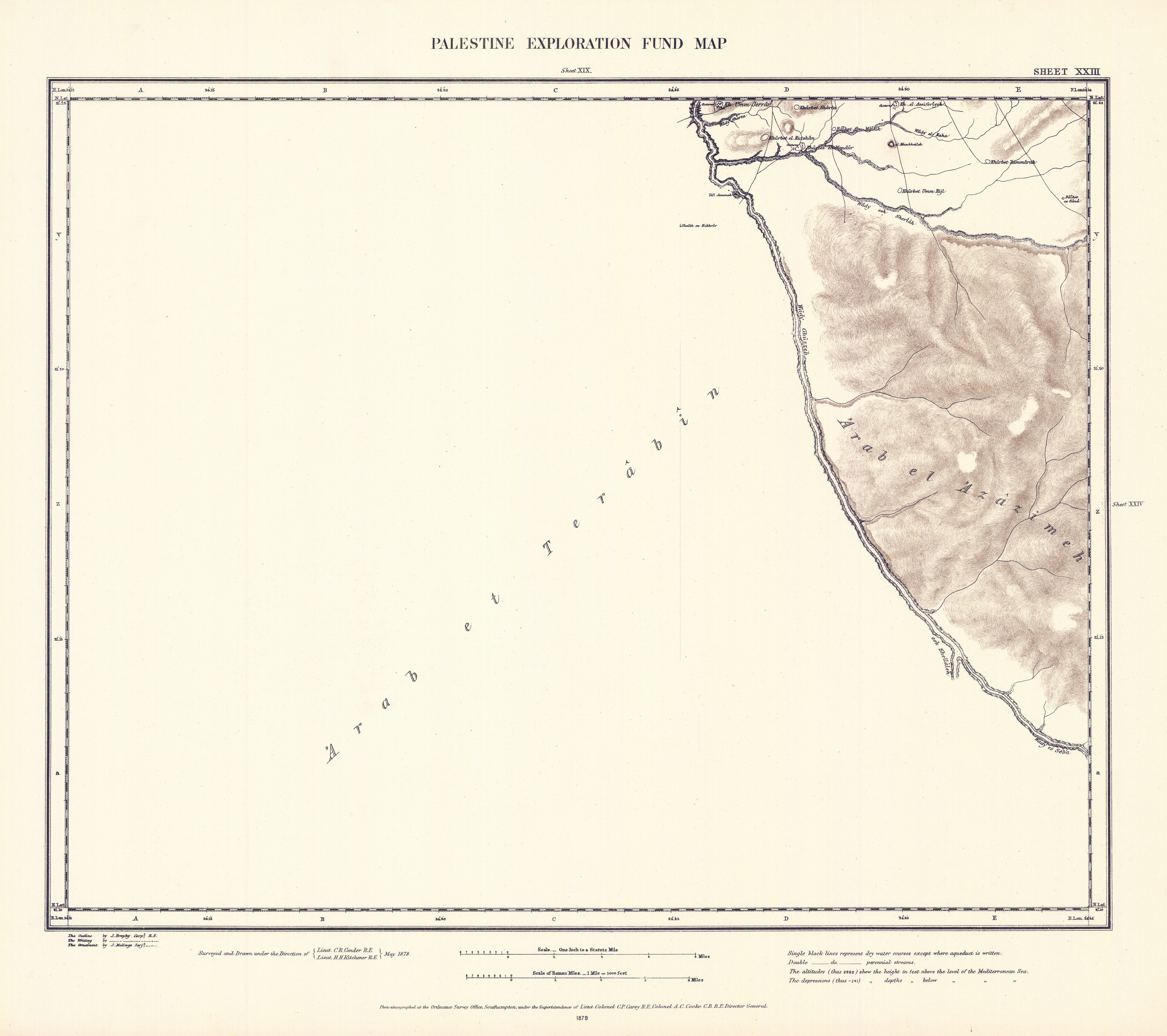
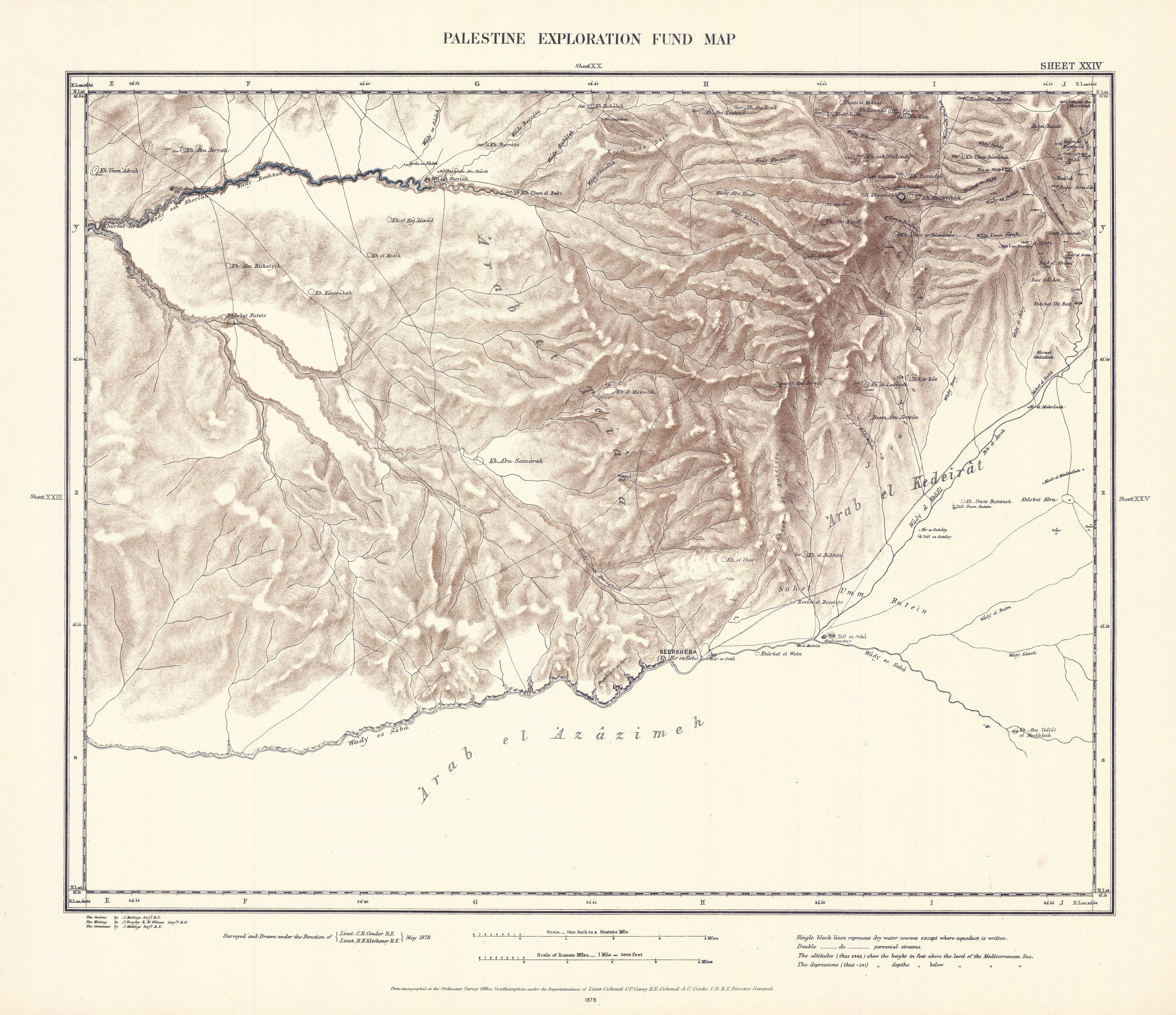
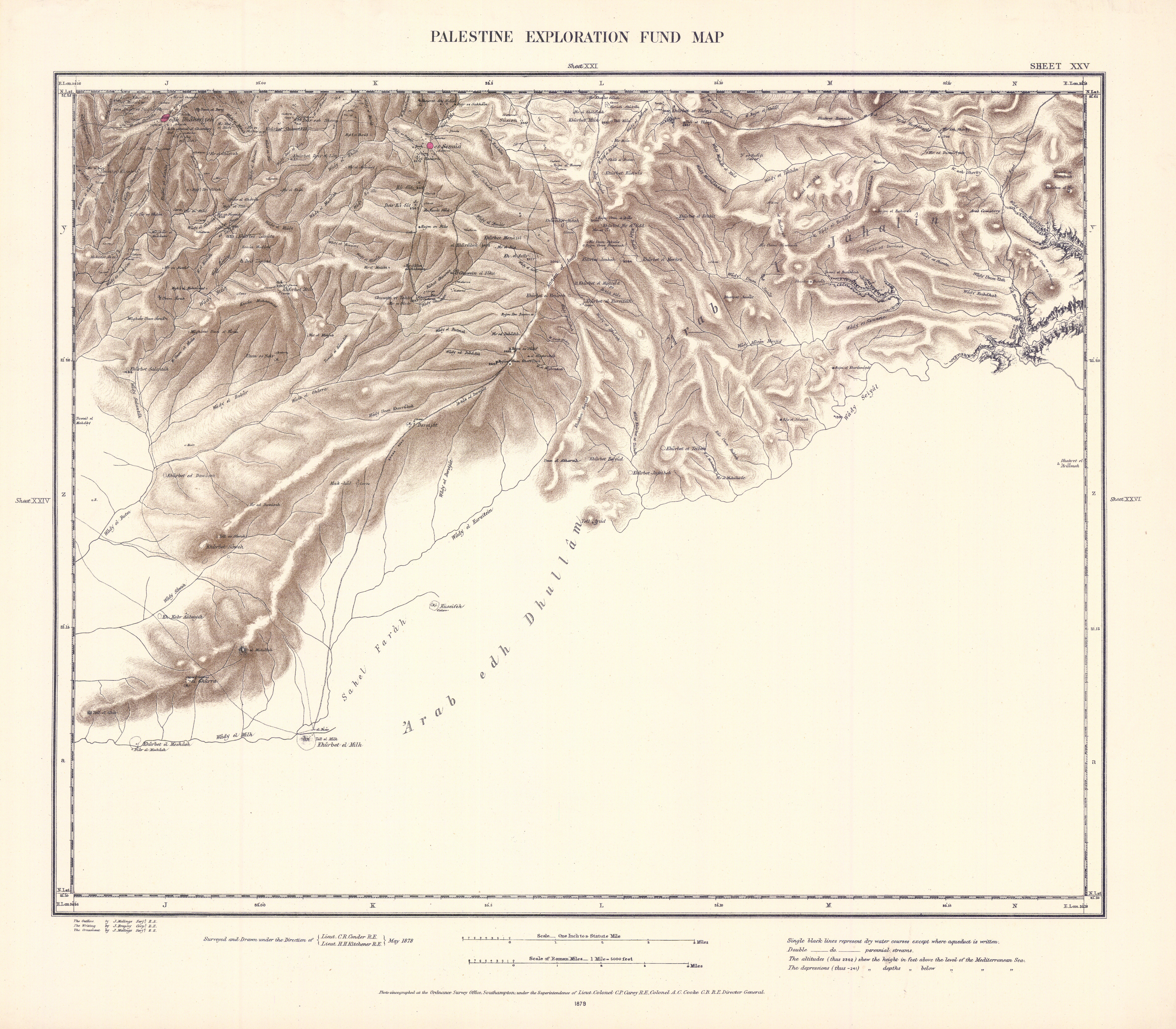
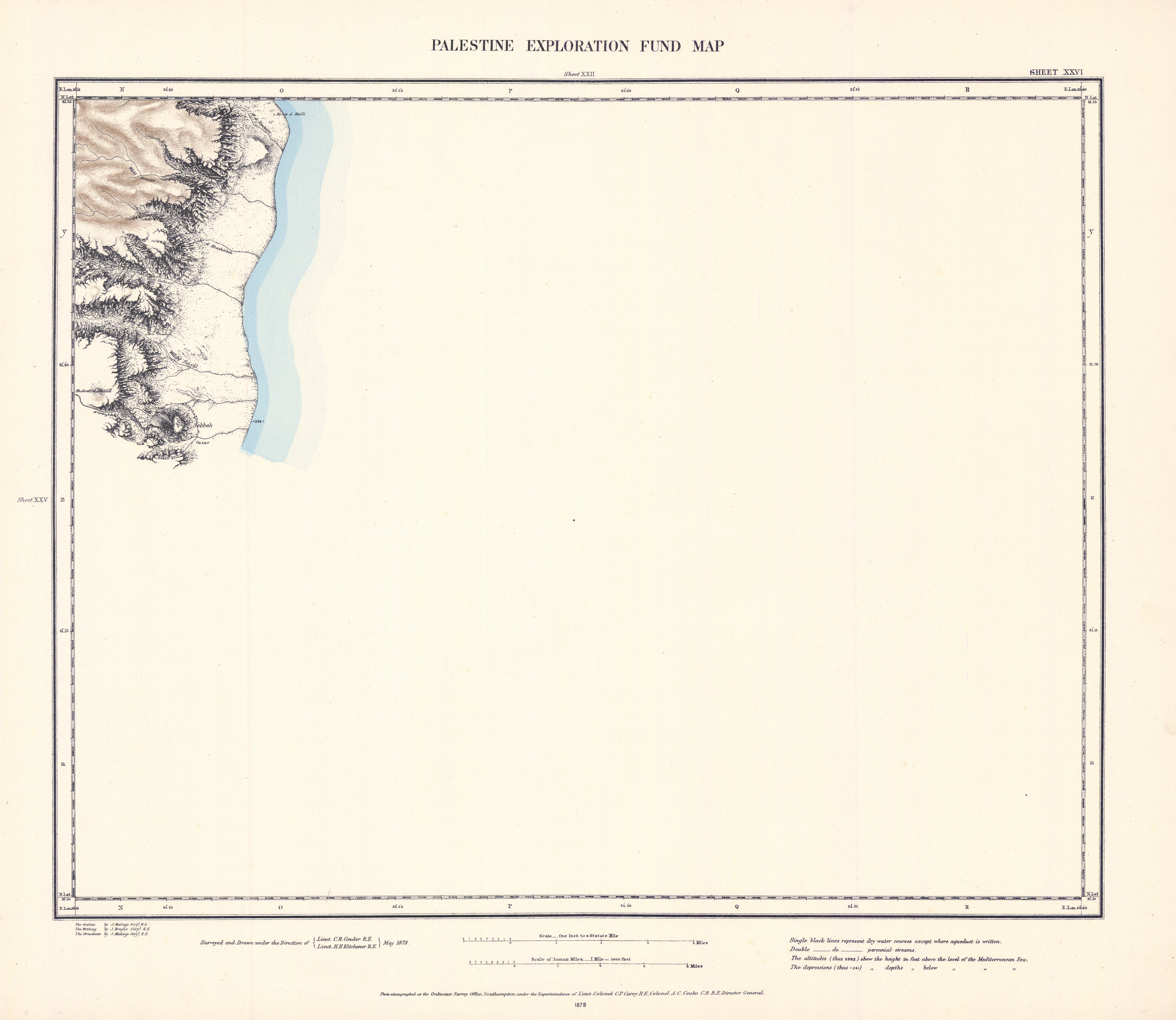
| A | B | C | D |
| | | | | 1 |
|---|---|---|---|---|
| | | | | 2 |
| | | | | 3 |
| | | | | 4 |
| | | | | 5 |
| | | | | 6 |
| | | | | 7 |
| | | | | 8 |
| | | | | 9 |
Each sheet is a separate clickable image. Higher resolution files available from the David Rumsey Historical Map Collection.

=== Eastern Palestine ===
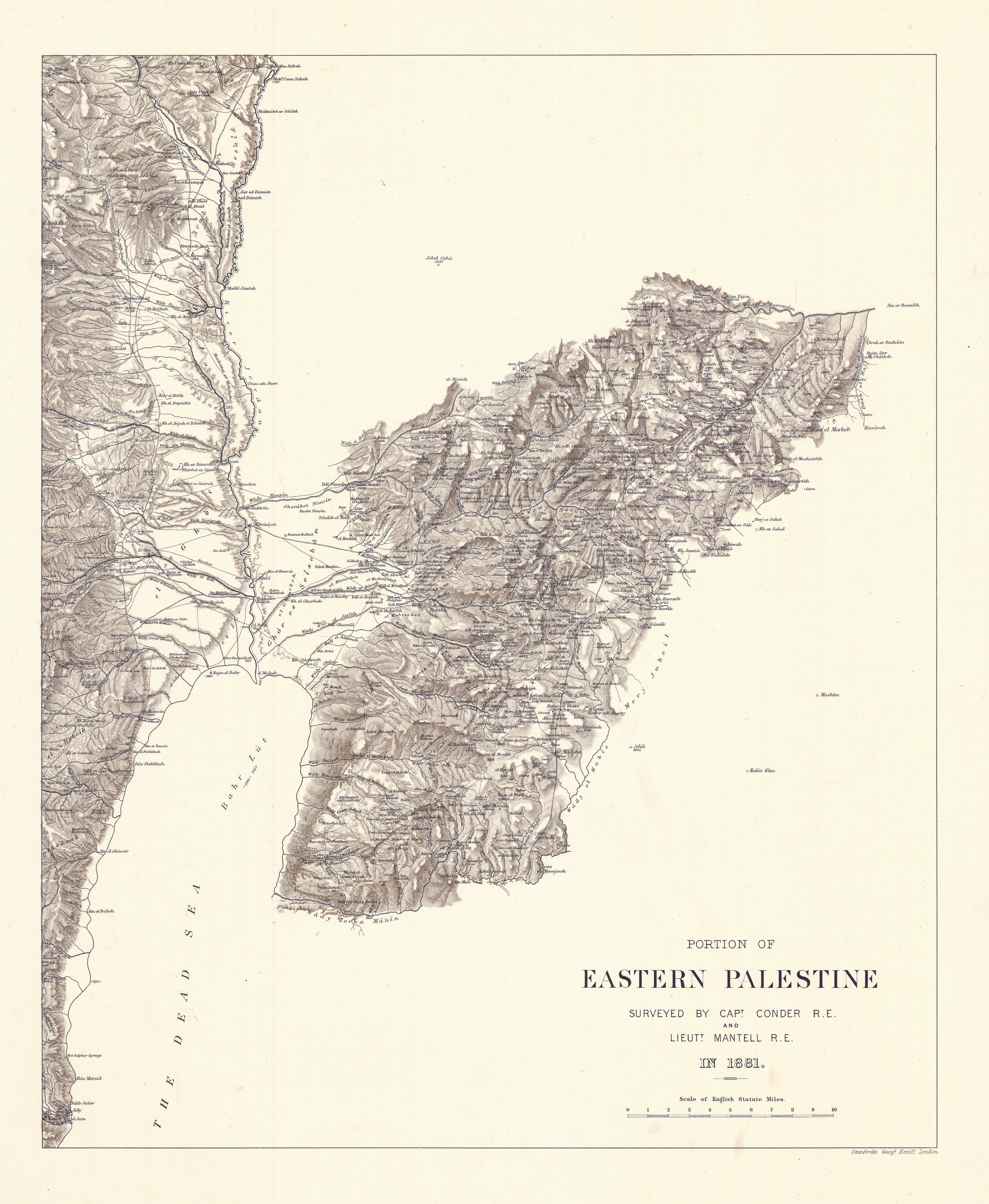

=== Surveying ===
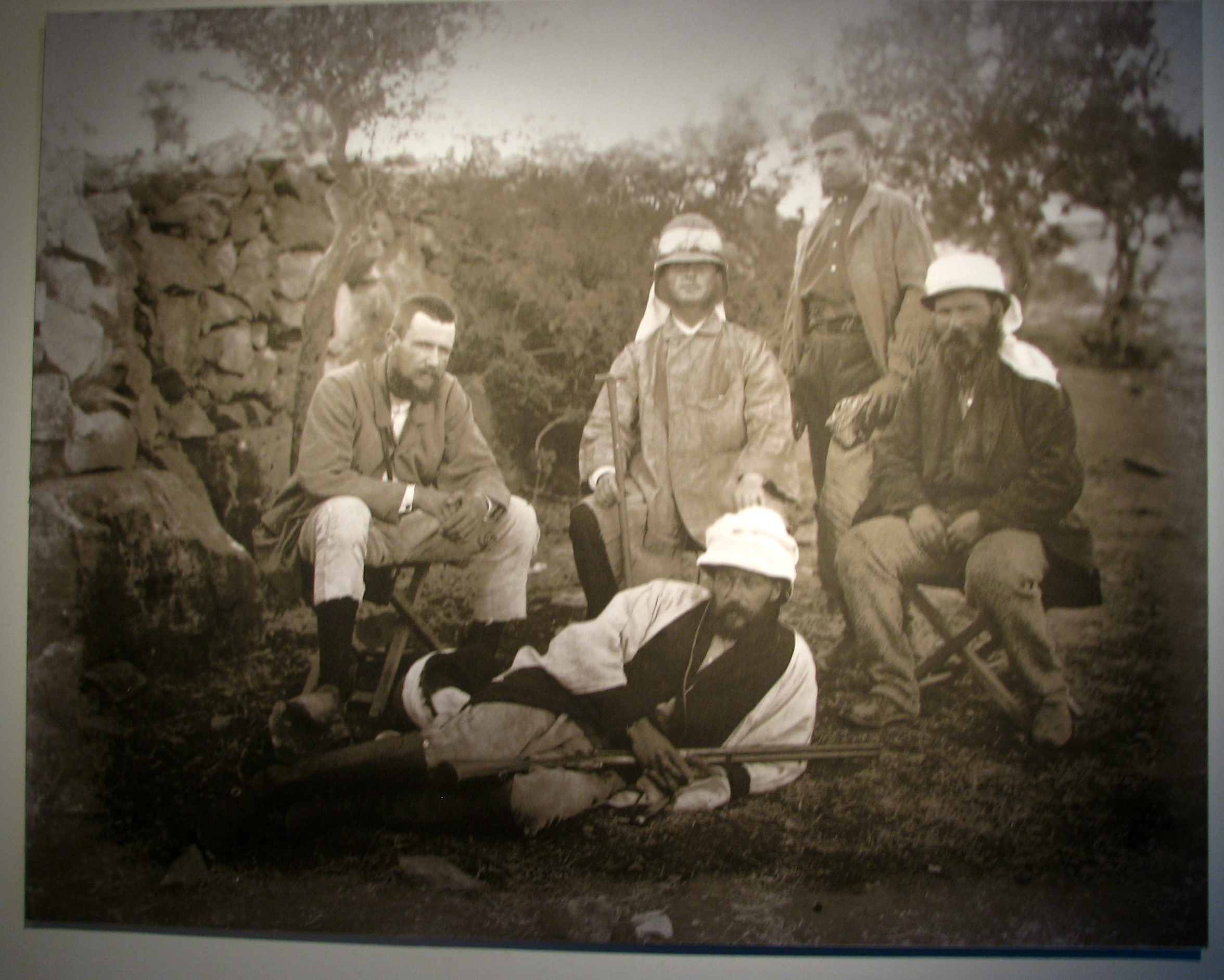
Charles Warren's surveying party in Jerusalem

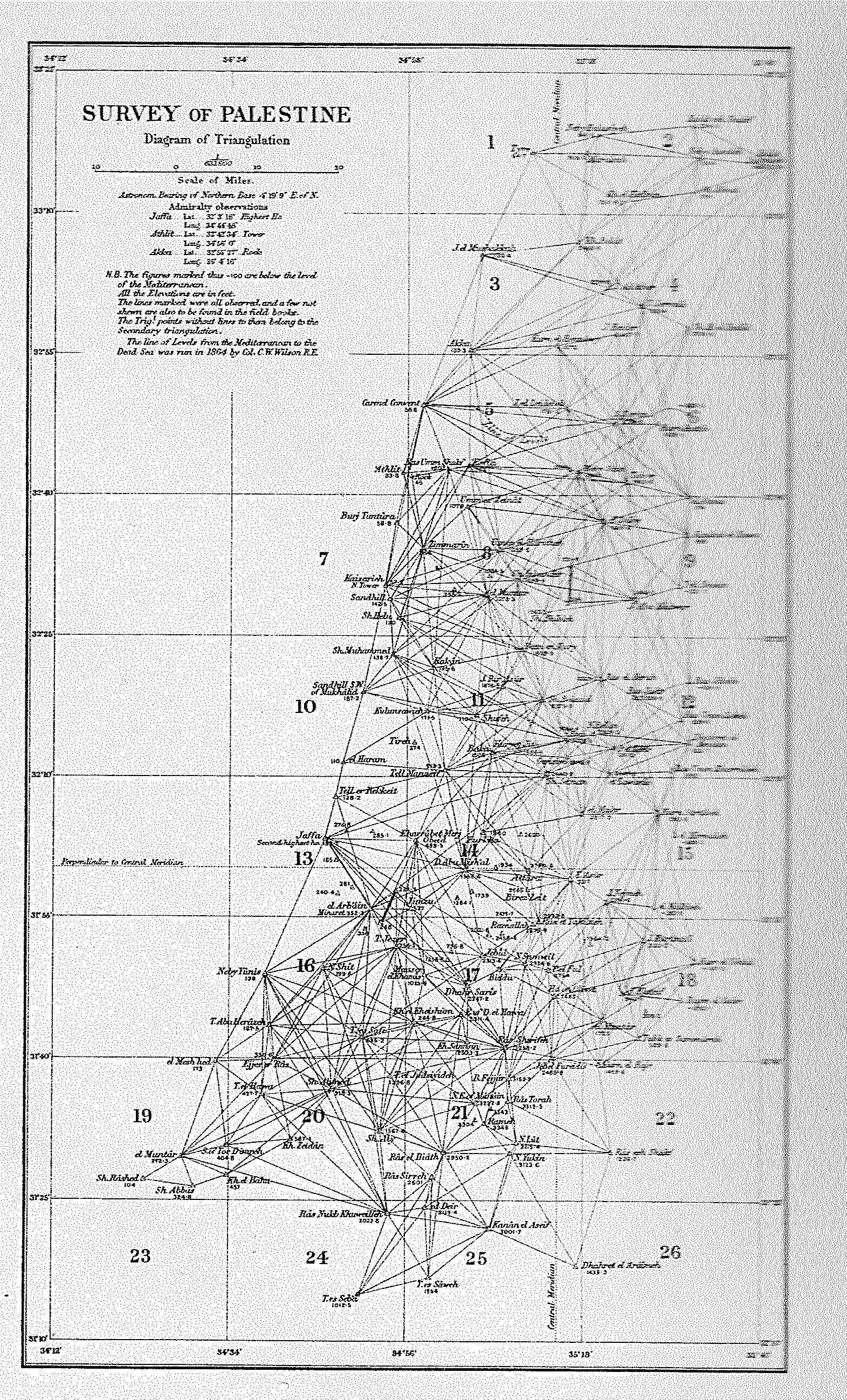
Triangulation network

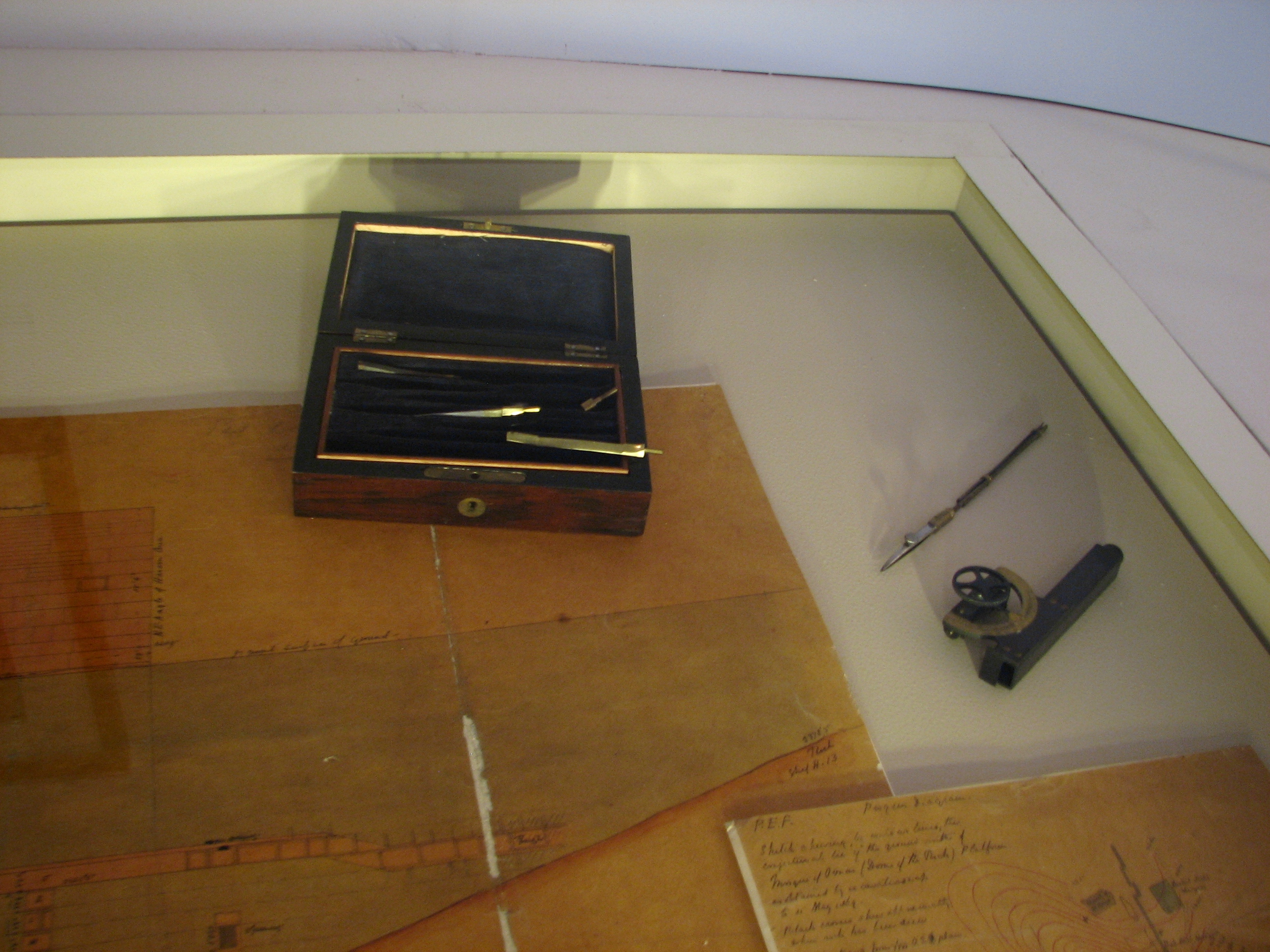
Writing utensils, a box, Compass and Navigation Device that were used by the PEF surveyors

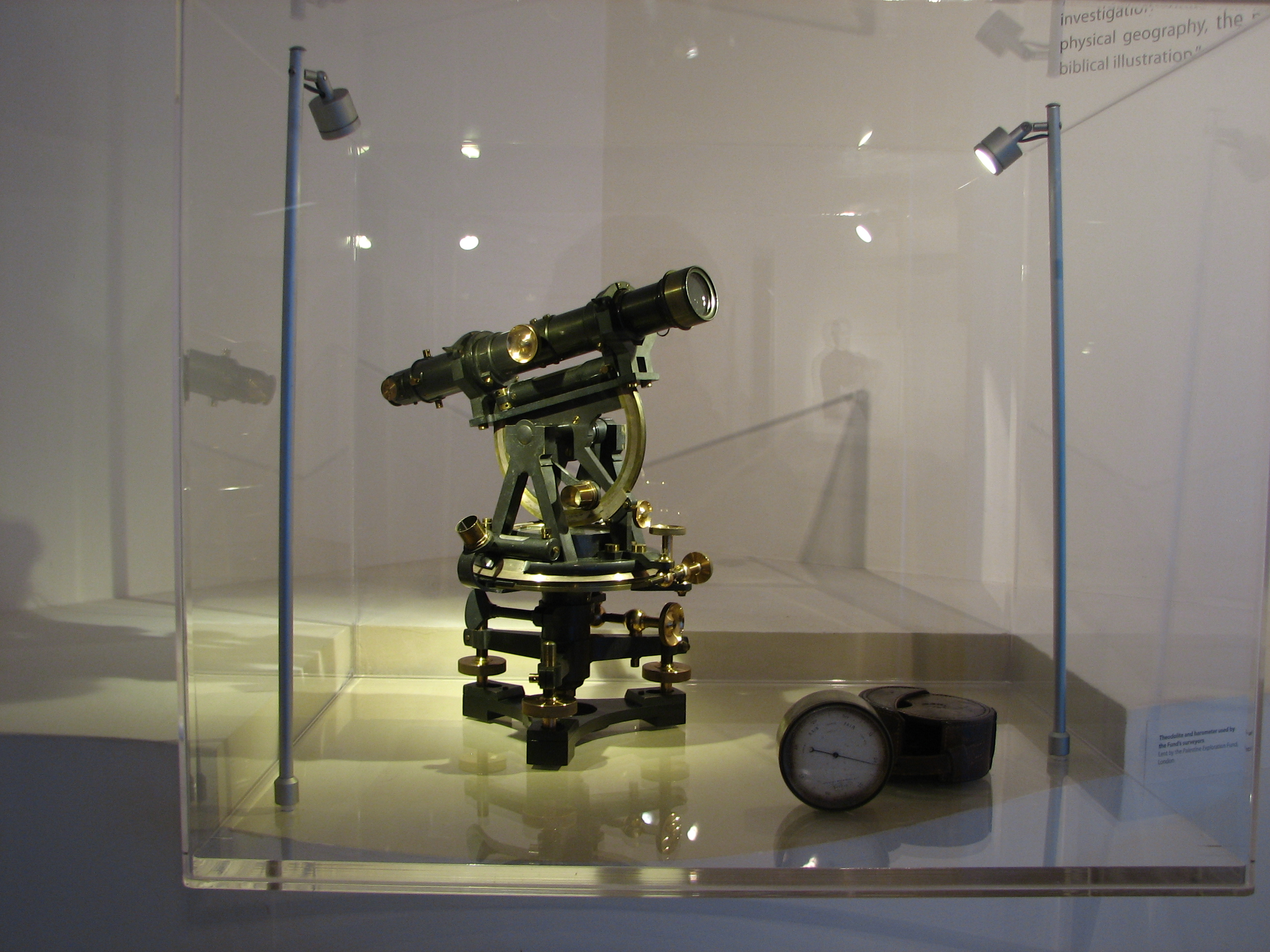
Theodolite and barometer that were used by the Palestine Exploration Fund surveyors

== General references ==
=== Primary sources ===
==== Survey of Western Palestine ====
- Introduction, by Trelawney Saunders (1881)
- 1.I. Galilee, by Conder and Kitchener (1881)
- 1.II. Samaria, by Conder and Kitchener (1882)
- 1.III. Judaea, by Conder and Kitchener (1883)
- 2. Special Papers on Topography, Archæology, Manners and Customs, Etc, contributed by Wilson, Warren, Conder, Kitchener, Edward Henry Palmer; Mr. George Smith; Rev. Greville Chester; Charles Simon Clermont-Ganneau (1881)
- 3. Jerusalem, by Warren and Conder (1884)
  - Plans, elevations, sections, etc. shewing the results of the excavations at Jerusalem, 1867-70, by Warren (1884)
- 4. The Fauna and Flora of Palestine, by Henry Baker Tristram (1885)
- 5. Memoir on the Physical Geology and Geography, by Edward Hull (1886)
- Arabic and English Name Lists, Edward Henry Palmer (1881)
- General Index, by Henry C. Stewardson (1888)

==== Survey of Eastern Palestine ====
- Survey of Eastern Palestine, by Conder (1889)

==== Memoirs ====
- Palestine Exploration Fund (2018) [1873]. Our Work in Palestine: Being an Account of the Different Expeditions Sent Out to the Holy Land by the Committee of the Palestine Exploration Fund Since the Establishment of the Fund in 1865. Forgotten Books (originally published by Bentley). ISBN 9780790524207.
- Warren, Sir Charles (1876). Underground Jerusalem: An Account of Some of the Principal Difficulties Encountered in Its Exploration and the Results Obtained. With a Narrative of an Expedition Through the Jordan Valley and a Visit to the Samaritans. R. Bentley and son.
- Conder, Claude Reignier (1878). Tent Work in Palestine: A Record of Discovery and Adventure. R. Bentley & Son.
- Wilson, Sir Charles William (1881–1883). Picturesque Palestine, Sinai and Egypt. D. Appleton.
- Hull, Edward (1885). Mount Seir, Sinai, and Western Palestine: Being a Narrative of a Scientific Expedition. Committee of the Palestine Exploration Fund / Richard Bentley & Son.
- Besant, Sir Walter (1889). Twenty-one Years' Work in the Holy Land: A Record and Summary, June 22, 1865-June 22, 1886. A. P. Watt.
- Conder, Claude Reignier (1889). Heth and Moab: Explorations in Syria in 1881 and 1882. Watt.

=== Secondary sources ===
- Conder, Major C.R. (n.d.). Palestine. New York: Dodd, Mead & Co. OCLC 427481948.
- Moscrop, John James (1 January 2000). Measuring Jerusalem: The Palestine Exploration Fund and British Interests in the Holy Land. A&C Black. ISBN 978-0-7185-0220-1.
- Chapman, Rupert (8 June 2013), "British Archaeology and the Holy Land in the 19th Century: sources and a framework for study'", Britain and the Holy Land 1800–1914
- Kamel, Lorenzo (2014). "The Impact of 'Biblical Orientalism' in Late Nineteenth and Early Twentieth-Century Palestine". New Middle Eastern Studies. 4. doi:10.29311/nmes.v4i0.2641 (inactive 12 July 2025). Archived from the original on 5 March 2016.
- Schelhaas, Bruno; Faehndrich, Jutta; Goren, Haim (28 February 2017). Mapping the Holy Land: The Foundation of a Scientific Cartography of Palestine. Bloomsbury Publishing. ISBN 978-0-85772-785-5.
- Silberman, Neil Asher (1990). Digging for God and Country: Exploration, Archeology, and the Secret Struggle for the Holy Land, 1799–1917. Doubleday. ISBN 978-0-385-41077-9.
- Foliard, Daniel (13 April 2017). Dislocating the Orient: British Maps and the Making of the Middle East, 1854–1921. University of Chicago Press. ISBN 978-0-226-45147-3.
- Goren, Haim (2002). "Sacred, but Not Surveyed: Nineteenth-Century Surveys of Palestine". Imago Mundi. 54 (1): 87–110. doi:10.1080/03085690208592960. JSTOR 1151507. S2CID 140702955.
- Masalha, Nur (2019). Palestine: A Four Thousand Year History. Zed. ISBN 978-1-78699-272-7.
- Raugh, Harold E. (2004). The Victorians at War, 1815–1914: An Encyclopedia of British Military History. ABC-CLIO. ISBN 978-1-57607-925-6.
