= Charlotte Ferguson-Davie =

British physician

Charlotte Elizabeth Ferguson-Davie OBE
- Born: Charlotte Elizabeth Hull; 7 July 1865; Cheetham, Manchester, England
- Died: 24 March 1943 (aged 77); Port Elizabeth, South Africa
- Medical career
- Profession: Physician
- Institutions: St. Andrew Mission Hospital
- Sub-specialties: Medical missionary
- Notable works: In Rubber Lands: An Account of the Work of the Church in Malaya

Charlotte Elizabeth Ferguson-Davie OBE (7 July 1865 – 24 March 1943) was a British medical doctor and the founder of the St. Andrew's Medical Mission and the St. Andrew Mission Hospital, the first women's and children's clinic in Singapore.

== Biography ==
Ferguson-Davie was born on 7 July 1865 in Cheetham, Manchester, where her father Irish geologist Edward Hull was working in the Geological Surveyer's Office. Raised in Ireland, she studied at Alexandra College in Dublin and earned a B.A. degree in German from the Royal University of Ireland. Ferguson-Davie went on to become a medical doctor. After completing the requirements for her bachelor's degrees in medicine and surgery at the London School of Medicine for Women in 1895, she went to India as a medical missionary in 1897.

Returning to England after a few years, Ferguson-Davie completed the requirements for her M.D. degree at the London School of Medicine for Women in 1901. In 1902 back working in India, she married the Anglican missionary Right Reverend Charles James Ferguson-Davie. Ferguson-Davie and her husband came to Singapore in 1909.

In 1913, she helped create the St. Andrew Medical Mission in order to help care for the "poor and disadvantaged." She opened a second clinic in 1914. In 1921, she published a book, In Rubber Lands: An Account of the Work of the Church in Malaya.

In 1923, she created the first women's and children's clinic in Singapore, named the St. Andrew's Mission Hospital (SAMH). She was able to obtain the land and get architects to work for her for almost "nothing." The next year, in 1924, Ferguson-Davie expanded the services that SAMH provided, including a venereal disease clinic. Ferguson-Davie set up training classes, teaching nursing and midwifery.

Ferguson-Davie became an officer of the Order of the British Empire in 1927 and in the same year, retired. She and her husband then moved to South Africa, where he worked at Fort Hare College. Ferguson-Davie died in 1943.

== Legacy ==
Ferguson-Davie was recognized for her medical work during the St. Andrew's Cathedral's Thanksgiving service in 2013. In 2014, she was inducted into the Singapore Women's Hall of Fame.
