= Edward Hull (geologist) =

Irish geologist and stratigrapher (1829–1917)

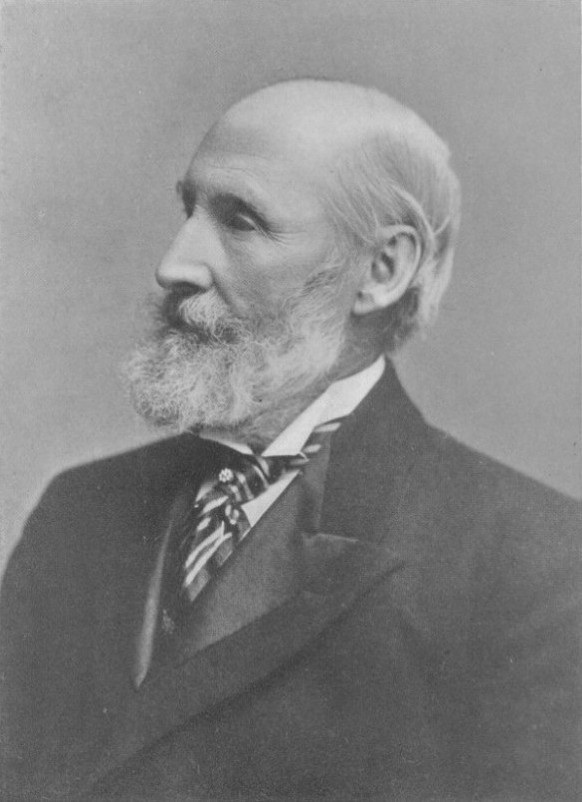
Prof. Edward Hull

Edward Hull FRS (21 May 1829 – 18 October 1917) was an Irish geologist and stratigrapher who held the position of Director of the Geological Survey of Ireland. He was also a professor of geology in the Royal College of Science, Dublin. His dates are listed in the Oxford Dictionary of National Biography.

== Biography ==
He was born in Antrim, Ireland, the eldest son of the Rev. John Dawson Hull. He attended Trinity College Dublin, receiving a diploma in civil engineering in 1849 and graduating with a B.A. degree.

Hull joined the Geological Survey of Ireland and worked in Wales and on the Lancashire Coalfield. He worked for the Geological Survey of Scotland (1867–1868) and led an expedition to survey parts of Arabia Petraea and Palestine (1883). He became Director of the Irish branch of the Survey and retired in 1891.

Hull was elected a Fellow of the Geological Society of London in 1855. He was elected a Fellow of the Royal Society in June 1867. Hull was President of the Royal Geological Society of Ireland in 1873. He was conferred an honorary LL.D. degree by the University of Glasgow in 1879. Hull was awarded the Murchison Medal in February 1890.

His daughter Charlotte Ferguson-Davie became a noted physician. He died at his home in Notting Hill, London, aged 88. Edward Hull's obituarist wrote of him, "He maintained the honour of a gentleman."

== Works ==
- The geology of the country around Wigan, Memoirs / Geological Survey. England and Wales; no. 89 S.W., H.M.S.O., London, 1860
- The geology of the country around Prescot, Lancashire (2nd ed.), H.M.S.O., 1865
- The Triassic and Permian rocks of the midland counties of England, [Gt. Brit. Geological survey] Memoirs of the Geological survey, England and Wales, H.M.S.O., London, 1869
- The Physical Geology and Geography of Ireland, Edward Stranforth, London, 1878; (revised, 2nd edition, 1891)
- The Survey of Western Palestine: Memoir on the Physical Geology and Geography of Arabia Petraea. Committee of the Palestine Exploration Fund. 1886.
- Volcanoes: Past and Present. The contemporary science series. London: Walter Scott, Ltd. 1892.
- The Wallchart of World History; This book has been updated in the late 20th century and 21st century.
- The Coal-fields of Great Britain: Their History, Structure and Resources, E. Stanford, 1861
- Geology of Belfast and the Lagan Valley: (One-Inch Geological Sheet 36) - with H. E. Wilson, Manning, P. I., and James Andrew Robbie.
- Reminiscences of a Strenuous Life (autobiography), 1909, 2nd edition, 1910
  - (review) "Review of Reminiscences of a Strenuous Life by Edward Hull". Nature. 83 (2118): 395–396. 2 June 1910. doi:10.1038/083395b0. hdl:2027/inu.39000025091393. S2CID 3991838.

== Family ==
Hull married in 1857 Mary Catherine Henrietta Cooke, daughter of Charles Turner Cooke, a surgeon in Cheltenham and his wife Catherine Bennett Cooke. They had a family of two sons and four daughters, who included Eleanor Hull and Charlotte Elizabeth Ferguson-Davie. Another daughter, Alice, married in 1896 John Hill Twigg (1841–1917) of the Indian Civil Service.

Coat of arms of Edward Hull
Notes 6 June 1901 Crest On a wreath of the colours a talbot's head erased Argent gorged with a collar dancettee Erminois between two laurel branches Proper. Escutcheon Sable a chevron engrailed Erminois between three talbots' heads erased Argent. Motto Vi Et Virtute
