= Armstrong (surname) =

Origin
- Meaning: Son of a strong man
- Region of origin: North East England; Scotland; Ireland

Armstrong is a surname originating in the Anglo-Scottish border. As of 1969, 'Armstrong' was the 171st most prevalent surname in the United States.

== History ==
The name Armstrong derives from a Middle English nickname which meant someone with strong arms.

The Scottish Armstrong is reputed to have been originally bestowed by "an antient (sic) king of Scotland" upon "Fairbairn, his armour-bearer" following an act of strength in battle.

Clan Armstrong is a famous Border Reiver clan from the border area between England and Scotland, although the Armstrongs were predominately based on the English side of the border. Many members of the clan were granted lands in County Fermanagh and neighbouring Irish counties during the Ulster Plantations.

In Ireland the name was also adopted as an Anglicization of two Gaelic names from Ulster: Mac Thréinfhir (meaning "son of the strong man") and Ó Labhraidh Tréan (meaning "strong O'Lavery"). From the name Ó Labhraidh Tréan (meaning "strong O'Lavery" and sometimes written in Anglo-Irish as "Tréanlámagh") the following surnames survive: "Trainor", Traynor", O'Lavery", "McLavery", and "MacLavery".

Although the name "Armstrong" is quite common in the Aghagallon and Glenavy area of County Antrim in Northern Ireland, the other names are to be found within the nine Ulster Counties and Scotland, especially along the west coast.

In the UK this surname is well represented in North East England, Cumbria, Lancashire, Yorkshire, Scottish Borders, Lanarkshire, Ayrshire, Dumfries & Galloway, and Northern Ireland. It is also well represented in the Deep South of the United States, and other southern states.

== Notable people ==
=== Disambiguation of common names with this surname ===
List does not include instances of the 'distinguish' template.

- Alan, Allan, Allen or Alun
- Alexander or Alex.
- Andrew.
- Beth
- Bob
- Brad
- Charles or Chuck
- Christopher or Chris
- Craig
- David, Davy or Dave
- Dick
- Edward
- Elizabeth, Bess, or Izzy
- Emily
- Frederick
- Gail
- Gary
- George
- Harry
- Henry
- Ian
- James
- Jim or Jimmy
- Joe
- John or Johnny
- Joseph or Joey
- Margaret
- Martin
- Mary
- Michael or Mike
- Neil
- Paul
- Peter
- Randy
- Richard
- Robert
- Samuel
- Thomas, Tom or Tommy
- Tim
- William, Willie, Bill, Billie or Billy

=== Arts and letters ===
- Alun Armstrong (actor) (born 1946), English actor
- Angeline Armstrong, Australian singer, songwriter, guitarist, and the frontwoman of Telenova
- Anton Armstrong (born 1956), American choral conductor and professor
- Arkeria Rose Armstrong (born 1988), Australian Aboriginal artist
- Benita Armstrong (1907–2004), British sculptor
- Bess Armstrong (born 1953), American actress
- Beth Diane Armstrong (born 1985), South African sculptor
- Billie Joe Armstrong (born 1972), American vocalist of Green Day
- Campbell Armstrong (1944–2013), Scottish writer
- Curtis Armstrong (born 1953), American actor
- Emily Armstrong (born 1986), American singer
- Eve Armstrong (born 1978), New Zealand artist
- Florian Cloud de Bounevialle Armstrong (born 1971), British pop singer Dido
- Frankie Armstrong (born 1941), English vocalist
- Franny Armstrong (born 1972), British film director
- Gail Armstrong (illustrator) (born 1966), British artist
- Gillian Armstrong (born 1950), Australian film director
- Graeme Armstrong (author) (born 1991), Scottish author
- Heather Armstrong (1975–2023), aka Dooce, American writer
- Helen Maitland Armstrong (1869–1948), American stained glass artist
- Jeannette Armstrong (born 1948), Canadian writer
- Jerome Armstrong (born 1964), American journalist
- Karen Armstrong (born 1944), English author
- Kelley Armstrong (born 1968), Canadian author
- Kerry Armstrong (born 1958), Australian actor
- Louis Armstrong (1901–1971), American jazz musician
- Maitland Armstrong (1836–1918), American artist and diplomat
- Margaret Neilson Armstrong (1867–1944), book designer, illustrator, and writer
- Mick Armstrong, Australian socialist and author
- Nancy Armstrong (born 1938), American literary scholar
- Paige Armstrong (born 1990), American Christian singer-songwriter
- Peter Armstrong (born 1957), English poet
- R. G. Armstrong (1917–2012), American actor
- Rebecca Patricia Armstrong (born 2002), Thai actress, singer, model
- Ruth Alice Armstrong (1850–1901), American social activist, writer, lecturer
- Ryan Kiera Armstrong (born 2010), American actress
- Samaire Armstrong (born 1980), American actor and fashion designer
- Tammy Armstrong (born 1974), Canadian poet and writer
- The Armstrong Twins, bluegrass and country music act in the 1940s and '50s
- Vaughn Armstrong (born 1950), American actor

=== Politics and government ===
- Adolphus T. Armstrong, Canadian politician
- Chris Armstrong (political theorist), British political theorist and author
- Cornelius W. Armstrong (1827–1883), New York politician
- Eric Armstrong, American politician
- Ernest Armstrong (British politician) (1915–1996), a British Labour Party politician.
- Estella Armstrong O'Byrne (1891–1987), American civic leader and anti-communist
- Frederick Thomas Armstrong (1907–1990), Canadian politician
- Hilary Armstrong (born 1945), British politician
- John Franklin Armstrong (1819–1887), Texas state representative
- Kelly Armstrong (born 1976), American politician from North Dakota
- Milton Taylor Armstrong (1887–1957), Canadian politician
- Tara Armstrong, Canadian politician
- Ward Armstrong (born 1956), American politician from Virginia

=== Religion ===
- Annie Armstrong (1850–1938) American missionary leader
- Garner Ted Armstrong (1930–2003), American evangelist, son of Herbert W. Armstrong
- Herbert W. Armstrong (1892–1986), American evangelist, father of Garner Ted Armstrong

=== Science and technology ===
- Alice Armstrong (1897–1989), American physicist
- Beulah Armstrong (1895–1965), American mathematician
- Dorsey Armstrong (born 1970), American Arthurian scholar
- Edwin Armstrong, full name Edwin Howard Armstrong, (1890–1954), American electrical engineer and inventor of FM radio
- James Armstrong (engineer) (1947–2010), British structural engineer
- Lilias Armstrong (1882–1937), English phonetician
- Mark Armstrong (astronomer) (born 1958), British amateur astronomer
- Neil Armstrong (1930–2012), American astronaut, first man on Moon
- William Ward Armstrong, Canadian computer scientist

=== Sports ===
- The Armstrong wrestling family (real last name James), an American family including:
  - Bob Armstrong (born Joseph Melton James, 1939–2020), and his sons:
    - Scott Armstrong (born Joseph Scott James, 1961)
    - Brad Armstrong (wrestler) (born Bradley James, 1962–2012)
    - Steve Armstrong (born Steve James, 1965)
    - Brian Armstrong, best known as Road Dogg (born Brian Girard James, 1969)
- Austin Armstrong (born c. 1993), American football coach
- Alun Armstrong (footballer) (born 1975), English player
- B. J. Armstrong (born 1967), former basketball player, most notably with the Chicago Bulls
- Brian Armstrong (footballer), New Zealand international football (soccer) player
- Bruce Armstrong (born 1965), American football player
- Colby Armstrong (born 1982), Canadian hockey player
- Cornell Armstrong (born 1995), American football player
- Chris Armstrong (footballer, born 1971), English association footballer
- Chris Armstrong (footballer, born 1982), British association footballer
- Dale Armstrong (1941–2014), Canadian drag racer
- Darrell Armstrong (born 1968), American professional basketball player
- Davey Armstrong (1956–2021), American boxer
- Debbie Armstrong (born 1963), Olympic gold medalist in Alpine skiing
- Desmond Armstrong (born 1964), American association footballer
- Dorance Armstrong (born 1997), American football player
- Duncan Armstrong (born 1968), Australian Olympic gold medalist in swimming
- Elizabeth Armstrong (water polo) (born 1983), an American water polo goalkeeper
- Evan Armstrong (1943–2017), Scottish boxer of the 1960s and 1970s
- Gary Armstrong (rugby) (born 1966), Scottish rugby player
- Gary Armstrong (footballer) (born 1958), English footballer
- Genevieve Armstrong (born 1988), New Zealand rower
- Gerry Armstrong (born 1954), Northern Irish footballer
- Graham Armstrong (1918–1960), American football player
- Hilton Armstrong (born 1984), American basketball player
- Ken Armstrong (footballer born 1924) (1924–1984), an England and New Zealand dual-international footballer
- Ken Armstrong (footballer born 1959) (1959–2022), an English-born footballer
- Kevin Armstrong (dual player) (1922–1992), Irish football player
- Kristin Armstrong (born 1973), professional road bicycle racer and Olympic gold medalist
- Lance Armstrong (born 1971), American cyclist
- Marcus Armstrong (born 2000), New Zealand racing driver
- Mark Armstrong (equestrian) (born 1961), British international representative show-jumper
- Mark Armstrong (footballer), New Zealand international football (soccer) player
- Neil Armstrong (ice hockey) (1932–2020), Canadian ice hockey player
- Neill Armstrong (1926–2016), American football player
- Norman Armstrong (1892–1990), English cricketer
- Otis Armstrong (1950–2021), American football player
- Ron Armstrong, a New Zealand international footballer
- Russ Armstrong (born 1962), American curler
- Shawn Armstrong (born 1990), American baseball player
- Stuart Armstrong (born 1992), Scottish footballer
- Taran Armstrong (born 2002), Australian basketball player
- Tommy Armstrong Jr. (born 1993), American football player
- Trace Armstrong (born 1965), American football player
- Warwick Armstrong (1879–1947), Australian Test cricketer

=== Military personnel ===
- Bigoe Armstrong (1717–1794), British Army general
- Charles L. Armstrong (1948–2011), United States Marine Corps lieutenant colonel
- D'Urban Armstrong (1897–1918), South African flying ace
- Frank A. Armstrong (1902–1969), United States Air Force General
- Frederick C. Armstrong (1895–1918), Canadian flight commander and flying ace
- Hugo Armstrong (1916–1943), Australian flying ace

=== Other ===
- Archibald Armstrong (died 1672), court jester to James I and Charles I
- Dwight Armstrong (1951–2010), American domestic terrorist
- Elizabeth Armstrong (settler) (1798–1857), American settler who took part in the Black Hawk War
- Eugene Armstrong (died 2004), American construction contractor who was beheaded in Iraq
- Herbert Rowse Armstrong (1870–1922), British murderer – the "Hay poisoner"
- J. Scott Armstrong (1937–2023), Wharton Business School professor
- Rebekka Armstrong (born 1967), American bodybuilder, former Playboy model and AIDS activist
- Sally Ward Lawrence Hunt Armstrong Downs, also known as Sallie Ward, (1827–1896), American socialite
- Harrison Armstrong, also known as Aitch, (born 1999), British rapper

== Fictional people ==
- The Armstrong family, victims of a crime in Murder on the Orient Express
- The Armstrong family, protagonists of Lisa: The Painful and its related games. Notably, Marty Armstrong, Bradley Armstrong, Lisa Armstrong, and Buddy Armstrong.
- Alex Louis Armstrong, the state alchemist from Fullmetal Alchemist
- Olivier Mira Armstrong, the Briggs general from Fullmetal Alchemist
- Catherine Elle Armstrong, the youngest daughter of Armstrong Family from Fullmetal Alchemist
- Chuck Armstrong, a character from the Cars film series
- Coach Armstrong, a character from Degrassi: The Next Generation.
- Jack Armstrong, the All-American Boy, radio series character on the show of the same name (1933–1951)
- Sam Armstrong, a character in the Canadian-American martial arts 1995 movie Law of the Jungle
- Sean Armstrong, the main protagonist in the film Mr. Nanny
- Seth Armstrong – a character from Emmerdale
- Steven Armstrong, the main antagonist from Metal Gear Rising: Revengeance
- Stretch Armstrong, action figure first introduced in the 1970s
- Sue Ellen Armstrong – a character from the fictional show Arthur
- Tina Armstrong and her father, Bass, two characters from the Dead or Alive video game series
