= William Armstrong =

William Armstrong and its variations may refer to:

== Politicians ==
- William Armstrong (corn merchant) (1778–1857), local politician and corn merchant
- Bill Armstrong (Australian politician) (1909–1982), member of the Parliament of Australia
- Billy Armstrong (politician) (born 1943), politician in Northern Ireland
- William Armstrong (Virginia politician) (1782–1865), U.S. representative from Virginia
- William Armstrong, Baron Armstrong of Sanderstead (1915–1980), British civil servant
- William Boardman Armstrong (1883–1954), lawyer and political figure in Nova Scotia, Canada
- William Drayton Armstrong (1862–1936), member of the Queensland Legislative Assembly
- William H. Armstrong (Wisconsin politician) (1840/41–1916), Wisconsin legislator
- William Hepburn Armstrong (1824–1919), U.S. representative from Pennsylvania
- William James Armstrong (1826–1915), merchant, miller and politician in British Columbia
- William L. Armstrong (1937–2016), U.S. senator from Colorado
- William Armstrong (Tennessee politician) (1795–1847), mayor of Nashville, Tennessee
- William W. Armstrong (journalist) (1833–1905), American journalist and politician from Ohio
- William W. Armstrong (politician) (1864–1944), American lawyer and politician in New York state
- William Oscar Armstrong (1847–1932), member of the Massachusetts House of Representatives

== Artists ==
- William Armstrong (Canadian artist) (1822–1914), Canadian artist
- Bill Armstrong (photographer), American fine art photographer

== Sports ==
- Bill Armstrong (announcer) (1932–2000), game show announcer
- Bill Armstrong (Australian footballer) (born 1936), former Australian rules footballer
- Bill Armstrong (American football coach) (1873–1938), American college football coach
- Bill Armstrong (English footballer) (1913–1995), English footballer
- Bill Armstrong (guard) (1920–1976), American football player
- Bill Armstrong (defensive back) (born 1955), American football player
- Bill Armstrong (ice hockey, born 1966), ice hockey player
- Bill Armstrong (ice hockey, born 1970), ice hockey player, coach, and executive
- Bill Armstrong (basketball) (born 1977), American college basketball coach
- William Armstrong (cricketer) (1885–1955), Australian cricketer
- William Armstrong (footballer) (1892–1968), Australian rules footballer
- William Armstrong (rugby league), rugby league footballer of the 1920s

== Music ==
- Bill Armstrong (music producer) (1929–2026), Australian music producer
- William Armstrong (music critic) (1858–1942), American music critic
- Billie Joe Armstrong (born 1972), American rock musician with Green Day
- Willie Armstrong (1804–?), Newcastle upon Tyne-born singer-songwriter

== Others ==
- William Armstrong (Christie's Will) (1565–1649), Scottish border freebooter, known as "Christie's Will"
- William Armstrong, 1st Baron Armstrong (1810–1900), British industrialist
- Duff Armstrong (William Armstrong, c. 1833–1899), 1858 defendant for the murder of James Preston Metzker in Mason County, Illinois
- William H. Armstrong (author) (1911–1999), author of the children's book Sounder
- William Nevins Armstrong (1835–1905), attorney general of Hawaii
- William Armstrong (pilot) (1924–1945), member of the Tuskegee Airmen
- William T. Armstrong (1929–2005), Canadian Broadcasting Corporation executive
- William Ward Armstrong, Canadian mathematician and computer scientist
- William Park Armstrong (1874–1944), theologian and New Testament scholar
- William Armstrong (theatre director) (1882–1952), British actor, theatre manager and director
- Billy Armstrong (actor) (1891–1924), British actor
- Billy Armstrong, alias of comics character Jeremy Karne
- William Charles Gordon Armstrong (1865–1951), pioneer in the early history of Calgary, Alberta, Canada
