= Charles Armstrong =

Charles Armstrong may refer to:

== People ==
=== Politicians ===
- Charles F. Armstrong (Pennsylvania politician) (1865–1934), American politician
- Charles F. Armstrong (Illinois politician) (1919–1965), member of the Illinois House of Representatives
- Charles Armstrong (politician) (fl. 2006–2017), member of the Arkansas House of Representatives

=== Sports ===
- Charles Armstrong (rower) (1881–1952), American rower who won a medal at the 1904 Summer Olympics
- Charles Armstrong (baseball) (1914–1990), American professional baseball player and football coach
- Charlie Armstrong (footballer) (1883–1954), Australian rules footballer
- Charlie Armstrong (American football) (1923–2002), American football halfback and fullback
- Chuck Armstrong (fl. 1960s–2014), U.S. Navy officer and president of the Seattle Mariners Major League Baseball club

=== Other people ===
- Charles Armstrong (physician) (1886–1967), American physician in the U.S. Public Health Service
- Charles Armstrong (British Army officer) (1897–1985), British military officer
- Charles Armstrong (c. 1926–1981), suspected victim of the Provisional IRA, see murder of Charles Armstrong
- Charles Armstrong (ethnographer) (born 1971), British ethnographer and technologist
- Charles K. Armstrong (born 1962), professor of Korean Studies at Columbia University involved in a plagiarism and falsification controversy
- Charles L. Armstrong (1944–2011), United States Marine Corps officer
- Charles Spearman Armstrong (1847–1924), pioneer tea and cinchona planter in British Ceylon
- Charles Armstrong-Jones (born 1999), great-nephew of Queen Elizabeth II

== Other uses ==
- Charles Armstrong School, California
