= Charles F. Armstrong =

Charles Armstrong may refer to:

- Charles F. Armstrong (Illinois politician) (1919–1965), member of the Illinois House of Representatives
- Charles F. Armstrong (Pennsylvania politician) (c. 1866–1934), American politician
