= Alexander Armstrong (disambiguation) =

Alexander Armstrong (born 1970) is a British comedian and presenter.

Alexander Armstrong or Alex Armstrong may also refer to:

- Sir Alexander Armstrong (Royal Navy officer) (1818–1899), British naval surgeon and explorer of the Arctic
- Alexander Armstrong (Australian politician) (1916–1985), Australian politician
- Alexander Armstrong (rugby union) (1897–1973), Australian rugby player
- Alexander Armstrong (Maryland politician) (1877–1939), Attorney General of Maryland
- Alex Louis Armstrong, fictional military officer in the Fullmetal Alchemist anime series

== See also ==
- Alexandra Armstrong, financial advisor
- Armstrong (surname)
