= James Armstrong =

James Armstrong may refer to:

== Law ==
- James Armstrong (Pennsylvania judge) (1794–1867), justice of the Supreme Court of Pennsylvania
- James Sherrard Armstrong (1821–1888), Canadian lawyer and British colonial jurist
- James R. Armstrong (1876–1956), judge of the Oklahoma Court of Criminal Appeals

== Politics ==
- James Armstrong (North Carolina politician) (died 1794), American Revolutionary War officer and politician
- James Armstrong (Georgia politician) (1728–1800), Georgia politician and candidate in the United States presidential election of 1789
- James Armstrong (Pennsylvania politician) (1748–1828), American Revolutionary War physician, United States congressman
- James Rogers Armstrong (1787–1873), manufacturer and political figure in Upper Canada
- James Armstrong (Texas politician) (1811–1879), member of the Second Texas Legislature
- James Dillon Armstrong (1821–1893), American lawyer, politician, and jurist from West Virginia
- James Armstrong (Ontario politician) (1830–1893), Canadian MP from Ontario
- James William Armstrong (1860–1928), Canadian politician from Manitoba

== Sport ==
- James E. Armstrong (1877–1960), Canadian sports executive
- James Armstrong (footballer, born 1887) (1887–1915), Scottish footballer
- James Armstrong (footballer, born 1892) (1892–1966), English footballer
- James Armstrong (soccer, died 1952), American soccer player and coach, in the National Soccer Hall of Fame
- James Armstrong (soccer, born 1979), English-born soccer coach in the United States

== Other fields ==
- James "Trooper" Armstrong (1736–1813), Irish-American soldier and pioneer
- James Francis Armstrong (1750–1816), American Revolutionary War chaplain, New Jersey Presbyterian
- James Armstrong (Unitarian minister) (1780–1839), Irish Unitarian minister
- James Armstrong (naval officer) (1794–1868), American naval officer in the Civil War
- James B. Armstrong (1824–1900), American businessman and Civil War officer
- James Isbell Armstrong (1919–2013), American academic, president of Middlebury College
- James Armstrong (engineer) (1926–2010), British structural engineer
- James Armstrong (musician) (born 1957), American blues guitarist and singer

== See also ==
- Jim Armstrong (disambiguation), for those known as Jim or Jimmy
- Arthur James Armstrong (1924–2018), bishop of the United Methodist Church
