= Chris Armstrong =

Chris Armstrong or Christopher Armstrong may refer to:

- Chris Armstrong (footballer, born 1971), former Crystal Palace and Tottenham Hotspur football player
- Chris Armstrong (footballer, born 1982), former Sheffield United football player
- Chris Armstrong (footballer, born 1984), Galway United football player
- Chris Armstrong (ice hockey) (born 1975), Canadian ice hockey player
- Chris Armstrong (Canadian football) (born 1967), former Canadian football player
- C. W. Armstrong (1899–1986), Northern Irish politician
- Christopher Armstrong (born 1947), current Dean of Blackburn
- Chris Armstrong (piper) (born 1980), Pipe Major of the ScottishPower Pipe Band
- Chris Armstrong (political theorist), British academic
