= Bob Armstrong (disambiguation) =

Bob Armstrong (1939–2020) was an American professional wrestler.

Bob Armstrong is also the name of:

- Bob Armstrong (boxer) (1873–1933), heavyweight boxer
- Bob Armstrong (ice hockey, born 1931) (1931–1990), Canadian ice hockey player
- Bob Armstrong (ice hockey, born 1961), American ice hockey player
- Bob Armstrong (politician) (1932–2015), member of the Texas House of Representatives
- Bob Armstrong (basketball, born 1920) (1920–2009), American basketball player
- Bob Armstrong (basketball, born 1933) (1933–2016), American basketball player
- Bob Armstrong (American football) (1909–1990), American football player
- Bob Armstrong (Australian footballer) (1875–1951), Australian rules footballer
- Bob Armstrong (English footballer) (1938–2014), English footballer
- Bob Armstrong (public servant) (1911–1988), Australian public servant and policy maker
- Bob Armstrong (policeman), (1948–2012), Australian policeman.

== See also ==
- Robert Armstrong (disambiguation)
