= James S. Armstrong =

James S. Armstrong may refer to:

- James Sherrard Armstrong (1821–1888), Canadian lawyer and jurist
- James Sinclair Armstrong (1915–2000), American politician

== See also ==
- James Armstrong (disambiguation)
