= George Armstrong =

George Armstrong may refer to:

== Politics and law ==
- George Robert Armstrong (1819–1896), American politician; mayor of Omaha, Nebraska
- George Armstrong (New Zealand politician) (1822–1905), Member of Parliament in Canterbury, New Zealand
- George W. Armstrong (1827–1877), American politician; first state treasurer of Minnesota
- George S. Armstrong (1867–1947), Canadian politician; mayor of Edmonton, Alberta
- George Armstrong (Manitoba politician) (1870–1956), Canadian politician and labour activist
- George C. Armstrong (1872–1950), American newspaper editor, businessman, and Illinois state senator
- George Thomas Armstrong (1881–1941), Canadian politician in Manitoba

== Sports ==
- George Armstrong (cricketer) (1882–1956), Australian cricketer
- Mule Armstrong (George Isaac Armstrong, 1885–1954), American baseball player
- George Armstrong (baseball) (1924–1993), American baseball player
- George Armstrong (ice hockey) (1930–2021), Canadian ice hockey player
- George Armstrong (footballer) (1944–2000), English football player

== Others ==
- George Armstrong (physician) (c. 1720–1789), English physician
- George Dod Armstrong (1813–1899), Presbyterian minister and writer
- George Armstrong (engineer) (1822–1901), English railway engineer
- George Frederick Armstrong (1842–1900), English professor of engineering
- George Johnson Armstrong (1902–1941), first British citizen to be executed under the Treachery Act 1940
- George Armstrong (actor) (1962–2023), English actor
- Sir George Carlyon Hughes Armstrong (1836–1907), English journalist and newspaper proprietor
- George Armstrong (1843 –1910), Scottish surveyor

== See also ==
- George Armstrong Custer (1839–1876), United States Army officer and cavalry commander in the American Civil War and the Indian Wars
