= Collection of Modern and Contemporary Art, Vatican Museums =

Art museum in the Vatican

Coordinates: 41.9033°N 12.4550°E

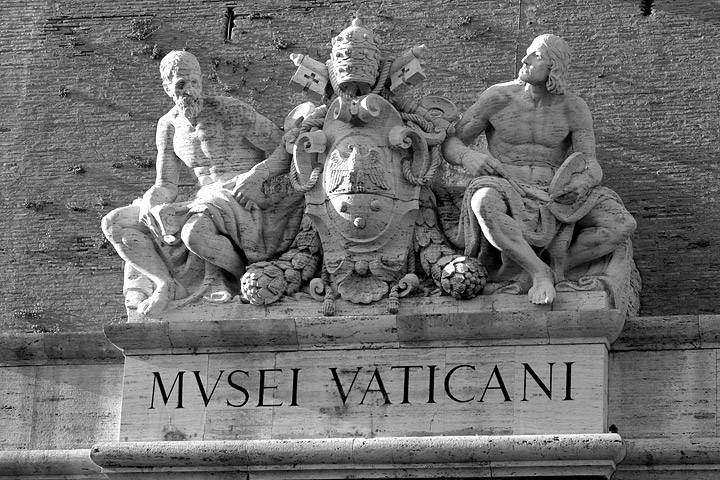
- Established: 1973
- Location: Vatican City
- Curator: Mario Ferrazza
- Website: https://museivaticani.va/content/museivaticani-mobile/en/collezioni/musei/collezione-d_arte-contemporanea/collezione-d-arte-contemporanea.html

The Collection of Modern and Contemporary Art is a collection of paintings, graphic art and sculptures in the Vatican Museums.

It occupies 55 rooms: the Borgia Apartment (apartment of Pope Alexander VI) on the first floor of the Apostolic Palace, the two floors of the Salette Borgia, a series of rooms below the Sistine Chapel, and a series of rooms on the ground floor. Approximately 250 artists created over 500 pieces that are displayed in the Borgia Apartments. The Collection was officially introduced to the public on June 23, 1973.

A permanent contemporary art gallery was installed on the premises in November 2021.

== Collection ==
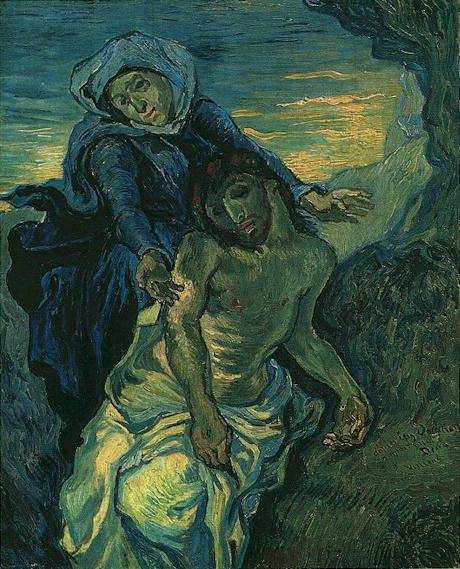
Vincent van Gogh Pietà, after Delacroix (first version), 1889 Oil on canvas, 41,5 x 34 cm, Vatican Collection of Modern Religious Art

The collection consists of almost 800 works by 250 international artists including: Francis Bacon, Giacomo Balla, Ernst Barlach, Max Beckmann, Émile Bernard, Bernard Buffet, Alice Lok Cahana, Marc Chagall, Eduardo Chillida, Giorgio de Chirico, Salvador Dalí, Maurice Denis, Otto Dix, Paul Gauguin, Renato Guttuso, Wassily Kandinsky, Paul Klee, Oskar Kokoschka, Alfred Manessier, Giacomo Manzù, Giorgio Morandi, Pablo Picasso, Odilon Redon, Auguste Rodin, Georges Rouault, Maurice Utrillo, Vincent van Gogh, and Henri Matisse. The majority of these works of art were donated by artists and collectors to the Holy See. The collection combines works that are "surrealist, cubist, post-impressionist, and expressionist."

In 2011, Matisse's son, Pierre, donated to the Vatican Museum. As a result, Matisse has his own room in the Vatican, containing a set of Catholic liturgical vestments called chasubles from Vence. Other notable works include Vincent Van Gogh's Pietà and Paul Gauguin's wooden relief. In the same room, post-Impressionist sculptor Merdardo Rosso created a wax work known as Aetas Aurea. Francis Bacon created a piece detailing Pope Innocent X. Auguste Rodin's aquatints and a Hand of God cast are also displayed in the Vatican.

Another room in the Vatican is dedicated to Marino Marini, a modernist Italian sculptor. Many of the donations in the Vatican came from private collectors and families, and Marini's wife, Marina, donated many of his pieces to the Vatican. His distinctly religious works are a bronze crucifix called Crocifisso, a relief sculpture titled Crocifissione, and a bust of a juggler, Giocoliere. The art of Gentili Guttuso, another Italian painter, occupies the eighth room of the Vatican Collection. His work is much more figurative than Marini's, focusing on religious subject matter but represented through an avant-garde style of abstraction. His work, similar to other artists featured, is somewhat surrealist.

The prehistory of the Collection of Modern Religious Art begun with the homily of Pope Paul VI during his encounter with artists in the Sistine Chapel on May 7, 1964. The Pope expressed an ambition to link the Church to contemporary art in order to bridge the past and present.

Pope Paul VI inaugurated the Collection of Modern Religious Art in 1973. Mario Ferrazza has been responsible for the collection since 1973. On April 23, 1999, Pope John Paul II introduced a new area to the Collection, which continues to expand in space and scope.

In 2018, the museum commissioned a group of established photographers to document and interpret the interior and architectural spaces of the museums. Works by Bill Armstrong, Peter Bialobrzeski, Antonio Biasiucci, Alain Fleischer, Francesco Jodice, Mimmo Jodice, Rinko Kawauchi, Martin Parr and Massimo Siragusa were exhibited in a subsequent exhibition called "A matter of light. Nine photographers in the Vatican Museums", the show was produced to be a symbolic beginning of a new photographic collection at the museum; with pictures that are directly related to the museum itself.

== See also ==
- Index of Vatican City-related articles
