= Thomas Armstrong =

Thomas, Tom or Tommy Armstrong may refer to:

== Politicians ==
- Thomas Armstrong (Australian politician) (1885–1955), member of the New South Wales Legislative Council
- Thomas Armstrong (New York politician) (1785–1867), New York politician
- Thomas Armstrong (Wisconsin politician) (1858–1927), Wisconsin politician
- Sir Thomas Armstrong (English politician) (c. 1633–1684), English army officer and MP, executed for treason
- Thomas Armstrong (Florida politician) (born 1937), American politician in the state of Florida
- Thomas E. Armstrong (born 1959), American Republican politician from Pennsylvania
- Thomas H. Armstrong (1829–1891), American Lieutenant Governor of Minnesota
- Tom Armstrong (politician) (1903–1957), Australian politician from New South Wales
- Tommy Armstrong (New Zealand politician) (1902–1980), New Zealand politician

== Sportspeople ==
- Thomas Armstrong (Oxford University cricketer) (1849–1929), English cricketer for Oxford University
- Thomas Armstrong (Nottinghamshire cricketer) (1872–1938), English cricketer for Nottinghamshire
- Thomas Armstrong (Australian cricketer) (1889–1963), Australian cricketer for Victoria
- Thomas Armstrong (Derbyshire cricketer) (1909–2000), English cricketer for Derbyshire
- Thomas Armstrong (footballer) (1898–1967), English footballer for Liverpool
- Tom Armstrong (footballer) (born 1954), Northern Irish footballer
- Tom Armstrong (rugby league) (born 1989), English professional rugby league footballer
- Tommy Armstrong Jr. (born 1993), American football player
- Tommy Armstrong (bowls) (born 1939), England international lawn bowler

== Other ==
- Sir Thomas Armstrong (musician) (1898–1994), English organist, conductor, educationalist and adjudicator
- Thomas Armstrong (writer) (1899–1978), British novelist
- Thomas Armstrong (painter) (1832–1911), English artist and arts administrator
- Thomas N. Armstrong III (1932–2011), American museum curator
- Thomas Armstrong (bishop) (1857–1930), Anglican bishop in Australia
- Tommy Armstrong (singer-songwriter) (1848–1920), 19th century singer-songwriter from County Durham
- Tom Armstrong (cartoonist) (born 1950), American cartoonist

== See also ==
- Thomas LeRoy Armstrong (1936–2022), Canadian businessman and politician
