= Joe Armstrong =

Joe Armstrong may refer to:

- Joe Armstrong (football scout) (1894–1975), chief scout of Manchester United F.C. after World War II
- Joe Armstrong (footballer, born 1908) (1908-1983), English footballer, see List of Bury F.C. players (1–24 appearances)
- Joe Armstrong (footballer) (born 1939), English footballer who played as an inside forward
- Joe Armstrong (actor) (born 1978), English actor
- Joe E. Armstrong (born 1956), American politician and member of the Tennessee House of Representatives
- Joe Armstrong (programmer) (1950–2019), designer and implementer of Erlang programming language
- Joe Lee Armstrong (born 1955), gospel singer
- Joe Armstrong, character in American Ninja

== See also ==
- Joseph Armstrong (disambiguation)
- Armstrong (surname)
