= Edward Armstrong =

Edward Armstrong may refer to:

- Edward Armstrong (cricketer) (1881–1963), Australian cricketer
- Edward Allworthy Armstrong (1900–1978), ornithologist and Church of England clergyman
- Edward Armstrong (historian) (1846–1928), English historian
- Edward H. Armstrong (1880–1938), mayor of Daytona Beach, Florida
- Edward Robert Armstrong (1876–1955), Canadian engineer and inventor
- Henry Edward Armstrong (1848–1937), English chemist
- Edward Frankland Armstrong (1878–1945), English industrial chemist
- Dr Edward George Armstrong, character in Agatha Christie's mystery novel, And Then There Were None
