= Gail Armstrong =

Gail Armstrong may refer to:

- Gail Armstrong (politician), American politician in the New Mexico House of Representatives
- Gail Armstrong (illustrator) (born 1966), British illustrator
