= Gary Armstrong =

Gary Armstrong is the name of

- Gary Armstrong (athlete) (born 1952), British sprinter, participated in the 1972 Summer Olympics
- Gary Armstrong (footballer) (born 1958), English association football player
- Gary Armstrong (cricketer) (born 1965), Bahamian cricketer
- Gary Armstrong (rugby union) (born 1966), Scottish rugby union player
