= Emily Armstrong (disambiguation) =

Emily Armstrong (born 1986) is an American musician who is the lead singer of Dead Sara and Linkin Park.

Emily Armstrong may also refer to:

- Murder of Emily Armstrong, 1949 murder in England
- Emily Armstrong (artistic swimmer) (born 2000), Canadian synchronized swimmer
