= Michael Armstrong =

Michael, Mike or Mick Armstrong may refer to:

== Politics ==
- Michael Armstrong (politician) (1924–1982), Northern Irish unionist politician
- Mike Armstrong (politician) (born 1957), American politician

== Sports ==
- Michael Armstrong (hurler) (born 1990), Northern Irish hurler
- Mike Armstrong (baseball) (born 1954), American baseball player
- Michael Armstrong (boxer) (born 1968), British boxer, born Michael Morris
- Michael Gomez (born 1977), Manchester-Irish boxer who was born Michael Armstrong

== Other ==
- Michael F. Armstrong (1932–2019), American lawyer
- C. Michael Armstrong (born 1938), American businessman, former chairman of AT&T
- Michael Armstrong (filmmaker) (born 1944), British writer, director, and cinematographer
- Mick Armstrong, Australian socialist activist and author
- Mike Armstrong, Canadian television journalist for Global National
- Mike Armstrong, American railfan and internet personality, known as CoasterFan2105

== See also ==
- Armstrong (surname)
