= Paul Armstrong =

Paul Armstrong may refer to:

- Paul Armstrong (playwright) (1869–1915), American playwright
- Paul Armstrong (author) (born 1981), British author
- Paul Armstrong (Irish footballer) (born 1978), Irish football midfielder
- Paul Armstrong (Scottish footballer) (born 1965), Scottish football forward
- Paul Armstrong (Australian footballer) (born 1957), Australian rules football player and administrator
- Curly Armstrong (1918–1983), American basketball player and coach
