= Jack Armstrong (English footballer) =

English footballer

Personal information
- Date of birth: 1884
- Date of death: 1963 (aged 78–79)
- Height: 5 ft 9 1/2 in (1.77 m)
- Position: Half back

Senior career*
Years	Team	Apps	(Gls)
1903–1905	Keyworth United		
1905–1922	Nottingham Forest	432	
- * Club domestic league appearances and goals

Jack Armstrong (1884–1963) was a footballer who played in The Football League for Nottingham Forest between 1905 and 1922.

Armstrong also played cricket for Nottinghamshire Seconds and made 17 appearances in the Minor Counties Championship between 1909 and 1910.

Armstrong came from a sporting family. His brother Thomas Armstrong played cricket for Nottinghamshire and another brother Albert played for Forest Reserves on several occasions.
