= Alice Lok Cahana =

Hungarian-American Holocaust survivor and painter

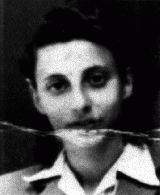
- her ID-card
- Born: February 7, 1929; Sárvár, Hungary
- Died: November 28, 2017 (aged 88); Portland, Oregon
- Occupation: Artist
- Known for: Holocaust survivor
- Website: www.alicelokcahana.com

Alice Lok Cahana (February 7, 1929 – November 28, 2017) was a Hungarian Holocaust survivor. Lok Cahana was a teenage inmate in the Auschwitz-Birkenau, Guben and Bergen-Belsen camps: her most well-known works are her writings and abstract paintings about the Holocaust.

Her work celebrates Judaism and those murdered in the Holocaust by transforming the horror of their deaths into a testament to their lives. As she told Barbara Rose in the From Ashes to the Rainbow catalog interview, "I started to paint only about the Holocaust as a tribute and memorial to those who did not return, and I am still not finished."

== Early life ==
Alice Lok Cahana was born in Sárvár, Hungary in 1929. She first learned to draw in a Jewish high school (Jewish students were forbidden to attend public schools at the time). In 1944 she and her entire family were transported to Auschwitz as part of the massive deportation of Hungarian Jews.

While imprisoned at Guben concentration camp, Lok Cahana made her first work of art in response to the Nazis mandating the children to decorate the barracks for Christmas. In an interview with an art historian, Lok Cahana explained, "There were no paper or pencils to make decorations; we practically had nothing except one broom to sweep the floor with. We were about 24 children in our barrack. I decided we should choreograph ourselves into a living candelabra and hold the pieces of the broom as a part of this sculpture. We won a prize – each of us a little can of snails."

Lok Cahana was liberated from Bergen-Belsen on April 15, 1945, where she was one of a few who survived. After the war, she lived in Sweden from 1952 to 1957 before immigrating to the United States. In 1959, she settled in Houston, Texas.

== Art career ==
Lok Cahana's formal art education began once she settled in Houston. She studied at the University of Houston and at Rice University, where color field painting was the dominant style. Her exposure to the works of Helen Frankenthaler, Morris Louis, and Kenneth Noland, color field painters collected by the Museum of Fine Arts, Houston, all contributed to the development of her mature style. When Lok Cahana initially came to America she "wanted to paint like this wonderful country, all bright colors, all happiness. I wanted everything smooth and seamless." But in 1978 she made the pivotal decision to return to Hungary and visit her birthplace where nothing remained of the Jewish community she had known. That there was no memorial to the vast numbers of Jews who had once played an important social, cultural, and economic role in Hungarian society, who had been dragged from their homes and sent to Nazi death camps, shocked her to the point that she felt she could no longer paint abstractions.

After her return from Hungary Lok Cahana began to create work through a new kind of mark-making, employing collage, along with an abstract visual language that could more directly express her memorial to the dead. She believed that her work had to be about the transcendence of the human spirit, the triumph of human spirituality over inhuman evil.

In an effort to make certain that no one could explain her imagery as simply fantasies of an artistic imagination she used literal photographs and documents: factual evidence that could not be disputed. It was during this period that she created a series dedicated to Raoul Wallenberg, the Swedish diplomat who handed out fake passports to Jews targeted for the death camps, saving more than 20,000 people, including Lok Cahana's father. Some of these faded passports were incorporated into the series as collage elements.

Additional works include newspaper clippings, photographs, pages from her mother's prayer book, and yellow stars. The "surface of her carefully structured compositions are subject to various processes: burned, scratched, stained with blood red pigment; the images are grafted, buried, partially eaten away."

In 2006, her piece No Names was added to the Vatican Museum's Collection of Modern Religious Art and since then is on permanent display at the museum in Rome, Italy. Her work appears in multiple prestigious museum collections around the world including Yad Vashem, the United States Holocaust Memorial Museum, the Skirball Museum at Los Angeles: Hebrew Union College, and the Center for Holocaust and Genocide Studies at the University of Minnesota.

== In media ==
Lok Cahana was one of five Hungarian Holocaust survivors whose story was featured in the Steven Spielberg 1998 Academy Award-winning documentary movie, The Last Days. Her writing was featured in "The Best Spiritual Writing 2011" and she is also featured in Auschwitz: The Nazis and the Final Solution.

She was photographed in her studio for New York photographer Mark Seliger's book and exhibition When They Came to Take My Father and was also written about in Michael Berenbaum's book A Promise To Remember as well as in the writings of art critic Barbara Rose. In 2000 she was a major contributor to the book, Voices from Auschwitz, which was produced by Joan Ringelheim for the United States Holocaust Memorial Museum.

== Personal life ==
Lok Cahana married Rabbi Moshe Cahana in Israel. They emigrated to Sweden where their first son, Rabbi Ronnie Cahana, was born. They finally settled in Houston where their two children, Michael and Rina, were born. Michael has served as the Senior Rabbi at Congregation Beth Israel in Portland, Oregon, since 2006.
