= Alexandra Armstrong =

American financial advisor

Alexandra (Alex) Armstrong
- Education: Newton College of the Sacred Heart

Alexandra (Alex) Armstrong is the chairwoman and founder of Armstrong, Fleming, & Moore. Armstrong was the first person to earn the Certified Financial Planner certification in Washington, D.C.

== Early life and education ==
Born and raised in the Washington, D.C., area. Alexandra Armstrong's father died when she was 8 years old. She attended Stone Ridge School in her early years, and went to Newton College of the Sacred Heart for her undergraduate degree.

Armstrong began her financial services career with stock brokerage firm Ferris & Company as a secretary to Julia Walsh, the first Washington woman to be successful in the brokerage business. In 1977, Walsh left Ferris & Company to start her own firm, and Armstrong made the transition along with her. When Walsh exited and sold her firm several years later, Armstrong started her own financial planning firm and broker-dealer in 1983.

In 1993, she co-authored On Your Own: A Widow's Passage to Emotional and Financial Well-Being with Mary Donahue, now in its 5th edition. The book is currently being updated and the sixth edition will release around January 2024. Both Armstrong and Donahue teamed up again in their most recent book, YOUR NEXT CHAPTER: A Woman’s Guide To A Successful Retirement, to help women navigate successfully through another major life transition.

== Serving financial planning ==
In addition to her work in her businesses, Armstrong served for seven years on the national board (1980–1987) for the International Association of Financial Planners, one of the predecessor organizations to the Financial Planning Association. Armstrong was also the first female president and chairwoman of the organization.

Armstrong is a founding member and ongoing board member for the Foundation for Financial Planning in 2000, and was a chairwoman of the non-profit organization as well.

== Outside activities ==
In addition to her work in financial planning, Armstrong is active outside the financial services industry. A past president of the Boy Scouts of America, National Capital Area Council (its first and only female president) of the Boy Scouts of America, she continues to serve on its advisory board. She served on the national board of Reading Is Fundamental (past treasurer) for over 20 years. She is a past president and current member of the Women’s Forum of Washington DC, which is part of an international organization of preeminent women in their respective fields. She is a member of the Cosmos Club (past chair investment committee). She also serves as the Vice President of the Boys and Girls Club of Sarasota and Desoto counties Foundation Board.

Armstrong has also served on the Board of Visitors of Georgetown University School of Business Administration, and was president of the National Association of Women Business Owners, Washington, D.C., and also the International Women's Forum of Washington, DC. For the past 40 years, Alexandra Armstrong has also coauthored a monthly column for the National Association of Investment Clubs magazine. She also writes a quarterly column on Retirement Planning for Women for the Journal of Financial Planning which goes to all Financial Planning Association members.

== Accolades ==
In 1985, Armstrong received the Award of Excellence in Commerce from Boston College Alumni Association. In 1994, she received the Alumni of the year award from Stone Ridge, her alma mater.

In 2004, Armstrong was the first woman to receive the P. Kemp Fain, Jr. award from the Financial Planning Association.

In 2006, she was inducted into the Washington Business Hall of Fame.
