= Joseph Armstrong =

Joseph Armstrong may refer to:

- Joseph Armstrong (engineer) (1816–1877), locomotive engineer from Britain
- Joseph G. Armstrong (1867–1931), American politician, mayor of Pittsburgh
- Joseph L. Armstrong, American academic
- Joseph Armstrong (footballer) (1892–1966), English footballer
- Joseph Elijah Armstrong (1866–1931), Canadian politician
- Joey Armstrong, the former drummer of the American punk rock band SWMRS
- Joseph Hunter Armstrong (born 2001), American swimmer and 2020 Olympic gold medalist

== See also ==
- Joe Armstrong (disambiguation)
- Joey Carbstrong (born 1988), animal rights activist
