= Harold Armstrong =

Harold Armstrong may refer to:

- Harold Armstrong (rapper) (born 1969), American rapper best known as DMG
- Harold Hunter Armstrong (1884–1979), American author
- Harold Armstrong (politician) (fl. 1930s), member of New York State Legislature
- Harold Armstrong, character in Anzacs (TV series)
- Harold Armstrong, High Sheriff of Fermanagh in 1967

== See also ==
- Harry Armstrong (disambiguation)
