= David Armstrong =

David or Dave Armstrong may refer to:

== Politicians ==
- David H. Armstrong (1812–1893), US senator from Missouri
- David L. Armstrong (1941–2017), American lawyer and politician
- David Malet Armstrong (1926–2014), Australian philosopher
- David Morrison Armstrong (1805–1873), merchant, insurance agent and political figure in Quebec
- David Armstrong (Wisconsin politician) (born 1961), Wisconsin state legislator

== Sportspeople ==
- Dave Armstrong (footballer) (born 1942), English footballer
- Davey Armstrong (1956–2021), American boxer
- David Armstrong (bobsleigh) (born 1964), British Olympic bobsledder
- David Armstrong (footballer, born 1954) (1954–2022), English international footballer
- David Armstrong (footballer, born 1987), Northern Irish footballer
- David Armstrong (rugby league) (born 2001), Australian rugby league player
- Davy Armstrong (born 1991), American-Cambodian former soccer player

== Theatrical professionals ==
- David Armstrong (director), American theatre director
- Dave Armstrong (playwright) (born 1961), New Zealander playwright

== Others ==
- Dave Armstrong (Catholic apologist) (born 1958), Catholic apologist and writer
- Dave Armstrong (producer) (born 1979), Canadian record producer
- Dave Armstrong (sportscaster) (born 1957), American television sports announcer
- David Armstrong (photographer) (1954–2014), American art photographer
- David A. Armstrong (born 1962), American cinematographer, film producer and director
- David G. Armstrong (born 1969), American physician and professor of surgery
- David Gilford Armstrong (1926–2000), British biochemist and expert in animal nutrition
- J. David Armstrong Jr., American academic and president of Broward College
- David Armstrong, a fictional character from the 2001 video game Operation Flashpoint: Cold War Crisis
- David Armstrong-Jones, 2nd Earl of Snowdon (born 1961), member of the British Royal Family, more commonly known as David Linley
