= Harry Armstrong =

Harry Armstrong may refer to:

- Harry George Armstrong (1899–1983), U.S. Air Force surgeon who first described the Armstrong Limit
- Harry Armstrong (politician) (1915–2011), Ohio Senator
- Harry Armstrong (English footballer) (1885–?), English footballer
- Harry Armstrong (Australian footballer) (born 2006), Australian rules footballer
- Harry Armstrong (diplomat), Irish-born diplomat for the United Kingdom, spy and businessman
- Harry Armstrong (composer) (1879–1951), American boxer and composer

== See also ==
- Harold Armstrong (disambiguation)
- Henry Armstrong (disambiguation)
