= Environmental impact statement =

Assessment required under US environmental law

An environmental impact statement (EIS), under United States environmental law, is a document required by the 1969 National Environmental Policy Act (NEPA) for certain actions "significantly affecting the quality of the human environment". An EIS is a tool for decision making. It describes the positive and negative environmental effects of a proposed action, and it usually also lists one or more alternative actions that may be chosen instead of the action described in the EIS. One of the primary authors of the act is Lynton K. Caldwell.

Preliminary versions of these documents are officially known as draft environmental impact statement (DEIS) or draft environmental impact report (DEIR).

== Purpose ==
The purpose of the NEPA is to promote informed decision-making by federal agencies by making "detailed information concerning significant environmental impacts" available to both agency leaders and the public. The NEPA was the first piece of legislation that created a comprehensive method to assess potential and existing environmental risks at once. It also encourages communication and cooperation between all the actors involved in environmental decisions, including government officials, private businesses, and citizens.

In particular, an EIS acts as an enforcement mechanism to ensure that the federal government adheres to the goals and policies outlined in the NEPA. An EIS should be created in a timely manner as soon as the agency is planning development or is presented with a proposal for development. The statement should use an interdisciplinary approach so that it accurately assesses both the physical and social impacts of the proposed development. In many instances an action may be deemed subject to NEPA's EIS requirement even though the action is not specifically sponsored by a federal agency. These factors may include actions that receive federal funding, federal licensing or authorization, or that are subject to federal control.

Not all federal actions require a full EIS. If the action may or may not cause a significant impact, the agency can first prepare a smaller, shorter document called an Environmental Assessment (EA). The finding of the EA determines whether an EIS is required. If the EA indicates that no significant impact is likely, then the agency can release a finding of no significant impact (FONSI) and carry on with the proposed action. Otherwise, the agency must then conduct a full-scale EIS. Most EAs result in a FONSI. A limited number of federal actions may avoid the EA and EIS requirements under NEPA if they meet the criteria for a categorical exclusion (CATEX). A CATEX is usually permitted when a course of action is identical or very similar to a past course of action and the impacts on the environment from the previous action can be assumed for the proposed action, or for building a structure within the footprint of an existing, larger facility or complex. For example, two recently completed sections of Interstate 69 in Kentucky were granted a CATEX from NEPA requirements as these portions of I-69 utilize existing freeways that required little more than minor spot improvements and a change of highway signage. Additionally, a CATEX can be issued during an emergency when time does not permit the preparation of an EA or EIS. An example of the latter is when the Federal Highway Administration issued a CATEX to construct the replacement bridge in the wake of the I-35W Mississippi River Bridge Collapse.

NEPA does not prohibit the federal government or its licensees/permittees from harming the environment, instead it requires that the prospective impacts be understood and disclosed in advance. The intent of NEPA is to help key decisionmakers and stakeholders balance the need to implement an action with its impacts on the surrounding human and natural environment, and provide opportunities for mitigating those impacts while keeping the cost and schedule for implementing the action under control. However, many activities require various federal permits to comply with other environmental legislation, such as the Clean Air Act, the Clean Water Act, Endangered Species Act and Section 4(f) of the Federal Highway Act to name a few. Similarly, many states and local jurisdictions have enacted environmental laws and ordinances, requiring additional state and local permits before the action can proceed. Obtaining these permits typically requires the lead agency to implement the Least Environmentally Damaging Practicable Alternative (LEDPA) to comply with federal, state, and local environmental laws that are ancillary to NEPA. In some instances, the result of NEPA analysis leads to abandonment or cancellation of the proposed action, particularly when the "No Action" alternative ends up being the LEDPA.

== Layout ==
An EIS typically has four sections:

- An Introduction including a statement of the Purpose and Need of the Proposed Action.
- A description of the Affected Environment.
- A Range of Alternatives to the proposed action. Alternatives are considered the "heart" of the EIS.
- An analysis of the environmental impacts of each of the possible alternatives. This section covers topics such as:

- Impacts to threatened or endangered species
- Air and water quality impacts
- Impacts to historic and cultural sites, particularly sites of significant importance to indigenous peoples.
- Social and economic impacts to local communities, often including consideration of attributes such as impacts on the available housing stock, economic impacts to businesses, property values, public health, aesthetics and noise within the affected area
- Cost and Schedule Analyses for each alternative, including costs and timeline to mitigate expected impacts, to determine if the proposed action can be completed at an acceptable cost and within a reasonable amount of time

While not required in the EIS, the following subjects may be included as part of the EIS or as separate documents based on agency policy.

- Financial Plan for the proposed action identifying the sources of secured funding for the action. For example, the Federal Highway Administration has started requiring states to include a financial plan showing that funding has been secured for major highway projects before it will approve an EIS and issue a Record of Decision.
- An Environmental mitigation plan is often requested by the Environmental Protection Agency (EPA) if substantial environmental impacts are expected from the preferred alternative.
- Additional documentation to comply with state and local environmental policy laws and secure required federal, state, and local permits before the action can proceed.

Every EIS is required to analyze a No Action Alternative, in addition to the range of alternatives presented for study. The No Action Alternative identifies the expected environmental impacts in the future if existing conditions were left as is with no action taken by the lead agency. Analysis of the No Action Alternative is used to establish a baseline upon which to compare the proposed "Action" alternatives. Contrary to popular belief, the "No Action Alternative" doesn't necessarily mean that nothing will occur if that option is selected in the Record of Decision. For example, the "No Action Alternative" was selected for the I-69/Trans-Texas Corridor Tier-I Environmental Impact Statement. In that Record of Decision, the Texas Department of Transportation opted not to proceed with building its portion of I-69 as one of the Trans-Texas Corridors to be built as a new-terrain route (the Trans-Texas Corridor concept was ultimately scrapped entirely), but instead decided to proceed with converting existing US and state routes to I-69 by upgrading those roads to interstate standards.

== NEPA process ==
The NEPA process is designed to involve the public and gather the best available information in a single place so that decision makers can be fully informed when they make their choices.

This is the process of EIS

- Proposal: In this stage, the needs and objectives of a project have been decided, but the project has not been financed.
- Categorical Exclusion (CATEX): As discussed above, the government may exempt an agency from the process. The agency can then proceed with the project and skip the remaining steps.
- Environmental Assessment (EA): The proposal is analyzed in addition to the local environment with the aim to reduce the negative impacts of the development on the area.
- Finding of No Significant Impact (FONSI): Occurs when no significant impacts are identified in an EA. A FONSI typically allows the lead agency to proceed without having to complete an EIS.

Environmental Impact Statement

- Scoping: The first meetings are held to discuss existing laws, the available information, and the research needed. The tasks are divided up and a lead group is selected. Decision makers and all those involved with the project can attend the meetings.
- Notice: The public is notified that the agency is preparing an EIS. The agency also provides the public with information regarding how they can become involved in the process. The agency announces its project proposal with a notice in the Federal Register, notices in local media, and letters to citizens and groups that it knows are likely to be interested. Citizens and groups are welcome to send in comments helping the agency identify the issues it must address in the EIS (or EA).
- Draft EIS (DEIS): Based on both agency expertise and issues raised by the public, the agency prepares a Draft EIS with a full description of the affected environment, a reasonable range of alternatives, and an analysis of the impacts of each alternative.
- Comment: Affected individuals then have the opportunity to provide feedback through written and public hearing statements.
- Final EIS (FEIS) and Proposed Action: Based on the comments on the Draft EIS, the agency writes a Final EIS, and announces its Proposed Action. The public is not invited to comment on this, but if they are still unhappy, or feel that the agency has missed a major issue, they may protest the EIS to the Director of the agency. The Director may either ask the agency to revise the EIS, or explain to the protester why their complaints are not actually taken care of.
- Re-evaluation: Prepared following an approved FEIS or ROD when unforeseen changes to the proposed action or its impacts occurs, or when a substantial period of time has passed between approval of an action and the planned start of said action. Based on the significance of the changes, three outcomes may result from a re-evaluation report: (1) the action may proceed with no substantive changes to the FEIS, (2) significant impacts are expected with the change that can be adequately addressed in a Supplemental EIS (SEIS), or (3) the circumstances force a complete change in the nature and scope of the proposed action, thereby voiding the pre-existing FEIS (and ROD, if applicable), requiring the lead agency to restart the NEPA process and prepare a new EIS to encompass the changes.
- Supplemental EIS (SEIS): Typically prepared after either a Final EIS or Record of Decision has been issued and new environmental impacts that were not considered in the original EIS are discovered, requiring the lead agency to re-evaluate its initial decision and consider new alternatives to avoid or mitigate the new impacts. Supplemental EISs are also prepared when the size and scope of a federal action changes, when a significant period of time has lapsed since the FEIS was completed to account for changes in the surrounding environment during that time, or when all of the proposed alternatives in an EIS are deemed to have unacceptable environmental impacts and new alternatives are proposed.
- Record of Decision (ROD): Once all the protests are resolved the agency issues a Record of Decision which is its final action prior to implementation. If members of the public are still dissatisfied with the outcome, they may sue the agency in Federal court. Opponents also have the option to legislatively stall such a project, usually by withholding funding for the project until specific concerns that arise from the NEPA process have been adequately addressed.

Often, the agencies responsible for preparing an EA or EIS do not compile the document directly, but outsource this work to private-sector consulting firms with expertise in the proposed action and its anticipated effects on the environment. Because of the intense level of detail required in analyzing the alternatives presented in an EIS or EA, such documents may take years or even decades to compile, and often compose of multiple volumes that can be thousands to tens of thousands of pages in length.

To avoid potential conflicts in securing required permits and approvals after the ROD is issued, the lead agency will often coordinate with stakeholders at all levels, and resolve any conflicts to the greatest extent possible during the EIS process. Proceeding in this fashion helps avoid interagency conflicts and potential lawsuits after the lead agency reaches its decision.

=== Tiering ===
On exceptionally large projects, especially proposed highway, railroad, and utility corridors that cross long distances, the lead agency may use a two-tiered process prior to implementing the proposed action. In such cases, the Tier I EIS would analyze the potential socio-environmental impacts along a general corridor, but would not identify the exact location of where the action would occur. A Tier I ROD would be issued approving the general area where the action would be implemented. Following the Tier I ROD, the approved Tier I area is further broken down into subareas, and a Tier II EIS is then prepared for each subarea, that identifies the exact location of where the proposed action will take place. The preparation of Tier II EISs for each subarea proceeds at its own pace, independent from the other subareas within the Tier I area. For example, parts of the proposed Interstate 69 extension in Indiana and Texas, as well as portions of the Interstate 11 corridor in Nevada and Arizona are being studied through a two-tiered process

== Strengths ==
By requiring agencies to complete an EIS, the act encourages them to consider the environmental costs of a project and introduces new information into the decision-making process. The NEPA has increased the influence of environmental analysts and agencies in the federal government by increasing their involvement in the development process. Because an EIS requires expert skill and knowledge, agencies must hire environmental analysts. Unlike agencies who may have other priorities, analysts are often sympathetic to environmental issues. In addition, this feature introduces scientific procedures into the political process.

== Limitations ==
The differences that exist between science and politics limit the accuracy of an EIS. Although analysts are members of the scientific community, they are affected by the political atmosphere. Analysts do not have the luxury of an unlimited time for research. They are also affected by the different motives behind the research of the EIS and by different perspectives of what constitutes a good analysis. In addition, government officials do not want to reveal an environmental problem from within their own agency.

Citizens often misunderstand the environmental assessment process. The public does not realize that the process is only meant to gather information relevant to the decision. Even if the statement predicts negative impacts of the project, decision makers can still proceed with the proposal.

== See also ==
- Natural environment
