= Peggy Armstrong =

Peggy Armstrong may refer to:

- Peggy Armstrong, fictional character in Heartbeat played by Gwen Taylor
- Peggy Armstrong, fictional character in Tugboat Annie Sails Again

== See also ==
- Margaret Armstrong (disambiguation)
