= Dave Armstrong (footballer) =

English footballer

Personal information
- Full name: David Thomas Armstrong
- Date of birth: 9 November 1942 (age 83)
- Place of birth: Mile End, England
- Height: 5 ft 10 in (1.78 m)
- Position: Left winger

Senior career*
Years	Team	Apps	(Gls)
- Barking
- Ilford
19??–1964	Hornchurch		
1964–1968	Millwall	20	(1)
1968–1970	Brighton & Hove Albion	44	(6)
1970–197?	Dover		
- Wimbledon
- * Club domestic league appearances and goals

David Thomas Armstrong (born 9 November 1942) is an English former professional footballer who played as a left winger in the Football League for Millwall and Brighton & Hove Albion.

== Life and career ==
Armstrong was born in Mile End, London, in 1942. A left-footed winger with considerable pace, he played amateur football for Barking, Ilford and Hornchurch, and played for the England amateur team in a trial match in November 1965, but turned professional with Millwall a few weeks later. He made three appearances as Millwall were promoted to the Second Division, and a further 17 at that level, before returning to the third tier with Brighton & Hove Albion in September 1968 for a £5,000 fee. He played in 44 matches in all competitions, was released at the end of the 1969–70 season, and moved back into non-league football with Dover and Wimbledon.
