= Samuel Armstrong =

Samuel Armstrong may refer to:

- Samuel C. Armstrong (1839–1893), Hawaiian-born military officer and educator
- Samuel Turell Armstrong (1784–1850), Massachusetts politician
- Samuel Armstrong (Canadian politician) (1844–1921), politician in Ontario, Canada
- Samuel Henry Armstrong (1855–1916), Ontario farmer and political figure
