= Bob Armstrong (English footballer) =

English footballer

Personal information
- Full name: John Robert Armstrong
- Date of birth: 1 July 1938
- Place of birth: Newcastle upon Tyne, England
- Date of death: September 2014 (aged 76)
- Place of death: Newcastle upon Tyne, England
- Position: Forward

Senior career*
Years	Team	Apps	(Gls)
1959–1960	Darlington	1	(0)
- Horden Colliery Welfare
- * Club domestic league appearances and goals

John Robert Armstrong (1 July 1938 – September 2014) was an English footballer who played as a forward in the Football League for Darlington and in non-league football for Horden Colliery Welfare.
