= Thomas Armstrong (Oxford University cricketer) =

English cricketer (1849–1929)

Personal information
- Full name: Thomas Hugh Armstrong
- Born: 21 April 1849; Wingate, County Durham
- Died: 27 January 1929 (aged 79); East Grinstead, Sussex
- Source: Cricinfo, 18 March 2017

Thomas Hugh Armstrong (21 April 1849 – 27 January 1929) was an English cricketer.

The son of William Armstrong of Wingate, County Durham, a mining engineer, he was educated at Rossall School and at St John's College, Oxford, matriculating in 1868.

He played one first-class match for Oxford University Cricket Club in 1869. Below first-class, he had appeared in one county match, for Shropshire in 1868.

He passed the final law examination in 1875. He was in a partnership with Arthur Fell, as solicitors; it was dissolved in 1897. He died at Leigh Hall, East Grinstead in 1929.

== See also ==
- List of Oxford University Cricket Club players
