= George Armstrong (cricketer) =

Australian cricketer

Personal information
- Born: 29 December 1882; Milton, Queensland, Australia
- Died: 12 January 1956 (aged 73); Brisbane, Queensland, Australia
- Source: Cricinfo, 1 October 2020

George Armstrong (29 December 1882 – 12 January 1956) was an Australian cricketer. He played in two first-class matches for Queensland between 1909 and 1911.

== See also ==
- List of Queensland first-class cricketers
