= Genevieve Armstrong =

New Zealand rower

Genevieve Armstrong (born 16 June 1988) is a New Zealand rower. She represented New Zealand at the 2010 World Rowing Championships, the 2013 World Rowing Championships and the 2013 World Rowing Cup.

Armstrong attended Massey University, New Zealand, and in 2012 received a Massey University Blues Award for outstanding achievement in sport.
