= Julia Montgomery Walsh =

American stockbroker (1923–2003)

- Born: Margaret Julia Curry; March 29, 1923; Akron, Ohio
- Died: July 2, 2003 (aged 80); Rockville, Maryland
- Occupations: Stockbroker; writer; businesswoman
- Spouses: John Montgomery (m. 1948; died 1957) Thomas M. Walsh (m. 1963; died 2002)

Margaret Julia Montgomery Walsh (née Curry; March 29, 1923 – July 2, 2003) was an American businesswoman and stockbroker during an era when it was rare for women to have a career in the securities industry. Walsh was the first woman to be registered with the American Stock Exchange, the first woman to be director of the U.S. Chamber of Commerce, and first woman to be president of the Greater Washington Board of Trade.

== Early life, education, and early career ==
Margaret Julia Curry was born on March 29, 1923, in Akron, Ohio, into a working-class family. Her father worked on the assembly line at Goodyear Tire and Rubber Company. Her mother was a bookkeeper before her marriage. Curry was president of her high school and a citywide student council. She excelled academically, earning a scholarship to Smith College and graduating as a salutatorian. Her mother encouraged her to enroll at Kent State and lived at home as a compromise with her father who objected to her pursuing further schooling, and instead wanted her to take a clerical position.

At Kent State, Curry was the first woman to be president of the student body. During summer after her sophomore year at Kent State, she was a member of a group of college students in the United States who studied world problems. She met First Lady Eleanor Roosevelt who inspired her to pursue a career in public service and to consider life pursuits not usually done by women. Curry graduated from Kent State in June 1945 as the first woman to receive an undergraduate degree in business administration.

In 1945, Curry applied for a position in United States government foreign service, and after passing the Foreign Service exam she relocated to Munich, Germany, to work as an administrative assistant at the consulate. She held another foreign service position as the director of the Fulbright Program in Turkey.

Curry met United States Army officer John Montgomery while the two were living in Germany. They married in 1948.

She enrolled in correspondence courses at New York University and at George Washington University to strengthen her career opportunities. George Ferris Jr., then vice president of Ferris & Company, was one of her professors and recognized her aptitude for financial investing. She was the first woman to earn a degree in business from George Washington University. Ferris hired her as a broker with his securities firm, Ferris & Co. Inc. in 1955.

In 1957, John Montgomery died in an accident. As a career woman with four children, she needed reliable childcare so she employed her mother-in-law to stay with her children, "paying her 20 percent of her earnings, plus health benefits, a pension plan and profit-sharing." Five years after she was widowed she had the highest earned income of any woman in Washington, DC.

In 1962 Montgomery at age 39 was the first woman to graduate from the 13-week Advanced Management Program of the Harvard Business School. While at Harvard Business School Montgomery faced the "full force of male chauvinism" for the first time.

She married Thomas M. Walsh, a real estate executive, in 1963. She was the mother to twelve children - four sons with Montgomery (John Montgomery, Stephen Montgomery, Michael Montgomery, and Mark Montgomery), one daughter with Walsh (Margaret Walsh Cornog), and seven stepchildren (Mary Frances Walsh, Patrick Joseph Walsh, Kathleen Walsh Carr, Thomas D. Walsh, Joan Walsh Cassedy, Anne Walsh Walton, Daniel E. Walsh).

== Career in finance ==
Walsh was recruited by her professor, George Ferris, to his securities firm, Ferris & Co. Inc. first as an unpaid intern in 1955. She spent twenty-two years at Ferris, and held positions of general partner (1959), senior vice president (1971) and vice chair (1973). At that time, Walsh was the only woman to be a partner of a New York Stock Exchange firm in Washington.

Attempting to change the 116-year tradition of male only membership, Walsh and Phyllis S. Peterson applied for full membership in American Stock Exchange (AMEX) in 1965. At the time the exchange had some women associate members, but no woman was a full member. Both women were admitted.

In 1972, she was the second woman elected to the AMEX Board of Governors, and the first woman to come from the securities industry. As a Governor, she successfully formulated a plan to attract companies to the AMEX.

In 1977 President Jimmy Carter offered her a seat on the Security Exchange Commission which she turned down because after her term ended she would be "too young to retire" and "too old to develop another career." Walsh served as director of Esmark and Pitney Bowes.

=== Julia M. Walsh and Sons ===
Looking for a challenge and thinking that the time was right for a woman to prosper in financial services, Walsh founded Julia Walsh and Sons in 1977. In November 1979, the firm joined the New York Stock Exchange.

At its peak Julia Walsh & Sons did between $20 million and $30 million a year in revenue. In 1983, Julia Walsh and Sons sold to Tucker, Anthony & R.L. Day Inc., a Boston investment and brokerage firm that was a subsidiary of the John Hancock Mutual Life Insurance Company. Walsh became a managing partner at Tucker, Anthony. At the time of the sale, John Montgomery, one of Walsh's business-partner sons, said that ''with deregulation, to do a good job, we have to offer an increasingly wide array of products.''

== Public service ==
Walsh thought that business people had a responsibility to engage in public service. In 1980, Walsh was appointed by President Jimmy Carter to Board of Directors of the Pennsylvania Avenue Development Corporation.

=== Democratic Party ===
Walsh served as co-treasurer of the National Democratic Party in 1966.

== Recognition ==
In 1969, Walsh received an honorary LL.D., Doctor of Laws from Hood College. In 1982, the American Association of University Women (AAUW) Educational Foundation presented Walsh with the AAUW Achievement Award. She was inducted into the Ohio Women's Hall of Fame in 1986.

== Later life and death ==
In 1985 Walsh was the first woman to be president of the Greater Washington Board of Trade. United States President George H. W. Bush appointed her to the commission to help rebuild post-Cold War Czechoslovakia.

Walsh retired in 1993 after several vascular strokes. Walsh and her family raised funds to research stroke prevention. In 1996, she wrote her memoir, Risks and Rewards: A Memoir, with Anne C. Carson.

Walsh died on July 2, 2003, in Rockville, Maryland.
