= Randy Armstrong =

Randy Armstrong may refer to:

- Randy Armstrong (musician), American musician and multi-instrumentalist
- Randy Armstrong (politician) (elected 2016), American politician from Idaho
- Randy Armstrong (Red), founder member in 2002 of US Christian rock band Red
