= Bill Armstrong (Australian footballer) =

Australian rules footballer

Personal information
- Full name: William Armstrong
- Born: 28 June 1936 (age 90)
- Original team: Chelsea
- Height: 177 cm (5 ft 10 in)
- Weight: 77 kg (170 lb)

Playing career^{1}
Years	Club	Games (Goals)
1958–59	Carlton	2 (0)
- ^{1} Playing statistics correct to the end of 1959.

Bill Armstrong (born 28 June 1936) is a former Australian rules footballer who played with Carlton in the Victorian Football League (VFL). In 2003 Bill was made an Officer in the General Division of the Order of Australia (AO) "For service to the international community... and raising awareness of social justice and human rights issues". His achievements have since been recognised through a perpetual award in his name, the Bill Armstrong AO Human Rights Award.

== Early life ==
Bill grew up on a sheep farm in Alexandra, central Victoria. He completed his Intermediate Certificate at St Bedes College Mentone and then an apprenticeship in Fitting and Turning. From 1958 until 1963 he worked as a youth worker with the Young Christian Workers (YCW) Movement.

== Australian football career ==
Bill is a former Australian rules footballer who played with Carlton in the Victorian Football League (VFL). He played two AFL league games for Carlton Football Club and won the seconds best and fairest in 1958.

== Working life and retirement ==
Bill Armstrong has been involved in Australian volunteering throughout his working, and retired life.

In 1964 he began a career in International Development as a staff member of the newly formed Overseas Service Bureau (now Australian Volunteers International, AVI) where he worked for seven years. During the 1970s he was National Co-ordinator of the Churches International Development Education Program, Action for World Development.

Bill was appointed chief executive officer of AVI in 1982, a position he held until 2002. When he took on the leadership role it was a small organisation of twelve or so staff and had a budget of $400,000. When he left, two decades later, staff had grown to 130 people nationally, the budget was over $20 million and the organisation managed 1000 volunteers in 45 countries, supporting developing countries and small and fragile states during times of crisis.

Since his retirement in 2002 he served as a member of the National Committee of Caritas Australia (2002-2009), a board member and vice-president of ActionAid Australia (formally Austcare—2003-2012) and as co-chair of Indigenous Community Volunteers (now Community First Development for a decade (2009-2019).

In 2022 a biography about Bill was published, 'Everything and nothing: the life and development work of Bill Armstrong'.

== Honours, decorations, awards and distinctions ==
In 1995 Bill was presented with a Friendship Award by the State Bureau of Foreign Experts, People’s Republic of China.

In 2000 he was the recipient of the Sir Edward Weary Dunlop Asia Medal, “In recognition of his significant contribution to forging stronger relations between Australia and Asia.”

In 2003 Bill was made an Officer in the General Division of the Order of Australia (AO) “For service to the international community... and raising awareness of social justice and human rights issues ".

In 2019, the ‘Bill Armstrong AO Human Rights Award’ was made in his honour on his retirement from Indigenous Community Volunteers (now Community First Development).

=== The Bill Armstrong AO Human Rights Award ===
The annual award is presented to an individual in recognition of outstanding contributions towards the promotion and protection of human rights. The inaugural award was presented in 2020. Recipients include Mervyn Eades (2020), Doyen Radcliffe (2021), and Dr Fiona Crockford (2022).
