= Paul Armstrong (author) =

- Born: 24 June 1981 (age 44)
- Education: University of Lincoln
- Occupations: Author, advisor, media commentator, and speaker

Paul Stephen Armstrong (born June 24, 1981) is a British author, technology consultant, and media commentator. He is the founder of the consulting firm TBD Group.

== Early life and education ==
Armstrong earned a bachelor's degree from the University of Lincoln between 1999 and 2002.

== Career ==
Early in his career, Armstrong worked in Los Angeles for companies including MySpace, Sony, and Activision. He later returned to the UK to head the social technologies team at the media agency Mindshare. Armstrong subsequently founded TBD Group, a London-based technology advisory firm. He was a founding member of the UK Governments Digital Centre of Excellence at 10 Downing Street, and has consulted for companies including PwC, Coca-Cola, and Unilever. In 2017, he authored "Disruptive Technologies: Understand, Evaluate, Respond" (Kogan Page), a book detailing how organizations can respond to technologies such as artificial intelligence, blockchain, and quantum computing.

Armstrong has contributed articles to publications including "Business Insider", "Forbes", "The Guardian", and the Evening Standard. He also writes a column for "City A.M." covering topics related to marketing and technology.
