= James Armstrong (footballer, born 1887) =

Scottish footballer

Personal information
- Full name: James Rae Armstrong
- Date of birth: 12 July 1887
- Place of birth: Dennistoun, Scotland
- Date of death: 10 October 1915 (aged 28)
- Place of death: Rouen, France
- Position: Forward

Senior career*
Years	Team	Apps	(Gls)
1912–1913	Kilmarnock	2	(2)
1913–1914	St Mirren	2	(0)
- Girvan Athletic
- * Club domestic league appearances and goals

James Rae Armstrong (12 July 1887 – 10 October 1915) was a Scottish professional footballer who played in the Scottish League for Kilmarnock and St Mirren.

== Personal life ==
Armstrong attended Whitehill Secondary School. He enlisted as a private in the 5th Battalion of the Queen's Own Cameron Highlanders after the outbreak of the First World War in August 1914. Anderson died of wounds at 5th General Hospital, Rouen, France on 10 October 1915 and was buried in St. Sever Cemetery, Rouen.

== Career statistics ==
Appearances and goals by club, season and competition
Club	Season	League			Scottish Cup		Total	
Club	Season	Division	Apps	Goals	Apps	Goals	Apps	Goals
Kilmarnock	1912–13	Scottish First Division	2	2	0	0	2	2
St Mirren	1913–14	Scottish First Division	2	0	0	0	2	0
Career total			4	2	0	0	4	2
