= Craig Armstrong =

Craig Armstrong may refer to:

- Craig Armstrong (composer) (born 1959), Scottish composer of modern orchestral music, electronica and film scores
- Craig Armstrong (footballer) (born 1975), English footballer, turned manager

== See also ==
- Armstrong (disambiguation)
