= Murder of Emily Armstrong =

1949 murder in London, England

Emily Frances Armstrong (c. 1880 – 14 April 1949) was a British victim of a murder that remains unsolved. She was 69, a widow and described as bespectacled, frail and friendly. She was also a devout Catholic and had been looking forward to the Easter services at St Joseph's Church in Wealdstone.

== Investigation ==
On 14 April 1949, the dry-cleaning shop which Emily Armstrong owned, on St John's Wood High Street in London, failed to reopen after lunch and a queue began to build up outside. After a while, two women went round to the back of the shop to try to find out why it was closed and discovered her body. She had been beaten to death with a blunt instrument; police later determined she had been killed roughly an hour before her body was found at around 4 o'clock in the afternoon. A postmortem examination also showed that her skull had been shattered by at least 22 blows, later believed to have been inflicted with a claw hammer.

Initially, police thought Armstrong was the victim of a botched robbery. Her handbag was missing at the crime scene and the till was open and empty. The handbag was later found nearby with a bloody handkerchief bearing the laundry mark H-612, although no leads resulted from that piece of evidence. Police believed that Armstrong's killer had followed her back to her shop at about 2.10 pm.

While authorities pursued several theories, they failed to find a suspect. Witnesses reported having seen a "suspicious man" around 30 years old and between 5'5" and 5'6"; however, police were unable to identify the individual. A murderer who had recently escaped from Broadmoor Hospital was also considered before witnesses failed to identify him in a police line-up. Several Army deserters were questioned too, but all ended up being released. Police eventually concluded that Armstrong's murderer was either a tramp or "a man who had fled to Ireland".

== See also ==
- List of unsolved deaths
- List of unsolved murders in the United Kingdom
