= Alan Armstrong (disambiguation) =

Alan, Allan, Allen or Alun Armstrong may refer to the following individuals:

== Sports ==
- Allan Armstrong (cricketer) (fl. 1930s), Rhodesian cricketer
- Alun Armstrong (footballer) (born 1975), English footballer

== Art and Entertainment ==
- Alan Armstrong (writer) (born 1939), American writer
- Alun Armstrong (born 1946), English actor

== Other people ==
- Alan Armstrong (born 1962), United States senator from Oklahoma and businessman.

== Fictional characters ==
- Alan Armstrong (Spy Smasher), superhero
- Senator Alan Armstrong on List of Stargate Universe characters
- Principal Allan Armstrong, character in Light It Up (film)
