= Alice Armstrong =

American physicist

- Born: December 8, 1897
- Died: January 22, 1989
- Education: Wellesley College, B.A. 1919; Radcliffe College, M.A. 1923, Ph.D. 1930
- Scientific career
- Workplaces: Bureau of Standards; Wellesley College; Rockefeller Institute; Los Alamos National Laboratory
- Thesis: The Relative Intensities of Some Lines in the X-Ray Spectrum (1930)
- Doctoral advisor: William Duane

Alice H. Armstrong was an American physicist known as one of the first female scientists at the National Bureau of Standards and as the first woman to earn a Ph.D. in physics from Harvard University, via Radcliffe College. She was elected a Fellow of the American Physical Society in 1931.

== Early life and education ==
Alice Armstrong was born on December 8, 1897. Armstrong grew up in Waltham, Massachusetts and attended a two-room country schoolhouse until she entered Waltham High School, where she studied Latin, German and French. Her mother hoped that she would attend Smith College in Northampton, Massachusetts, but she chose Wellesley College instead after visiting there with a friend. At Wellesley, she originally intended to major in French and German, but she took a physics course on the advice of her older half-brother, an engineer, and she went on to earn a degree in physics with a minor in chemistry. Armstrong graduated from Wellesley in 1919.

== Graduate studies ==
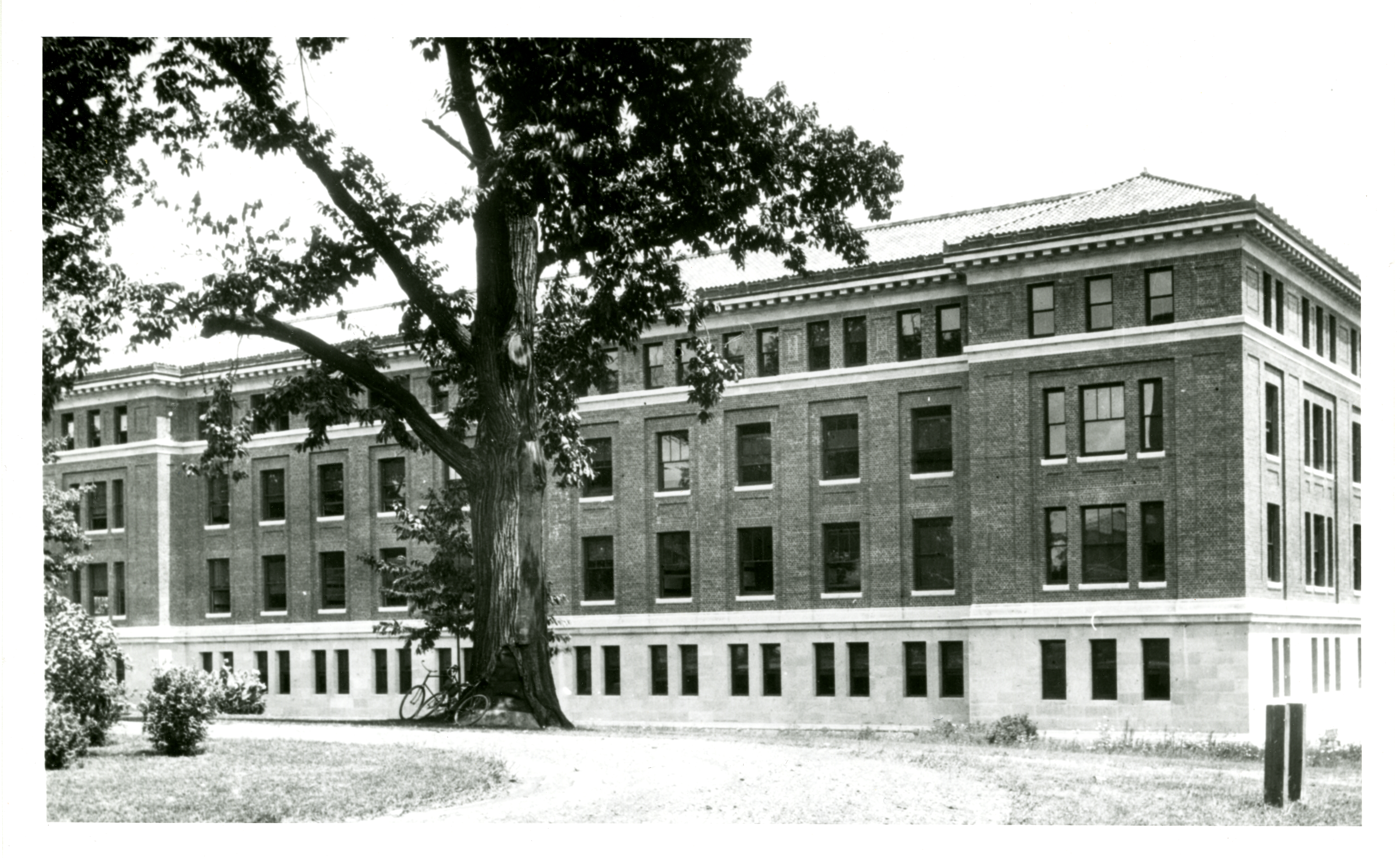
Armstrong worked at this building at the National Bureau of Standards, which was devoted entirely to the work in Electricity, Photometry, Radium, X-Ray, and Radio Communication.

Armstrong developed an interest in radioactivity during her time at Wellesley. After graduating in 1919, she took a job at the National Bureau of Standards. She began work checking radium-dial watches used by the army, and then transferred to the radium section as an assistant physicist. The Bureau's radium laboratory had the responsibility of checking the quality and amount of radium samples, and the lab director was frequently absent due to a stomach ulcer. "So," Armstrong later recalled, "after only a few months, I found myself more or less in charge of certifying all the radium sold in the United States."

After three years at the Bureau of Standards, in 1922 Armstrong went to Radcliffe College for graduate studies. She experienced discrimination from some of the Harvard professors, including being banned from some graduate classes. She earned her master's degree in 1923 and began to conduct X-ray spectroscopy with William Duane.

While working with Duane on her graduate studies, a laboratory accident exposed Armstrong to half a lethal dose of x-ray radiation. Armstrong fell ill for a year and a half. She began working part-time at Wellesley college in the 1925–26 academic year, and then from 1927 to 1929 she worked at the Rockefeller Institute for Medical Research as a research assistant in biophysics.

In 1929 Armstrong returned to Harvard and continued her work on x-rays as well as working for the Harvard Cancer Commission at Huntington Hospital in Boston. Armstrong was awarded her Ph.D. in 1930, with a thesis entitled "The Relative Intensities of Some Lines in the X-Ray Spectrum." She was the first woman to earn a Ph.D. in physics from Harvard University, although, because of the university's arrangement for female students, the degree was granted through Radcliffe College.

== Career ==
After earning her Ph.D., Armstrong returned to Wellesley where she worked as an assistant professor of physics. She was promoted to associate professor in 1936. In 1945 Armstrong became the Louise McDowell Professor at Wellesley, and from 1945 to 1950 she served as department chair.

During World War II Armstrong took two leaves from Wellesley. During the first leave in 1939–1940, she worked on acoustics at the University of California Los Angeles. In 1944-1945 she worked at the Harvard University Underwater Sound Laboratory as a special research associate.

While at Wellesley in 1950, Armstrong took a sabbatical to work at Los Alamos National Laboratory. Although she returned to Wellesley in 1952, she retired from the college only a year later to work as a permanent staff member at Los Alamos. She was appointed an Assistant Group Leader in the Physics Division in 1957. In 1958 she and her colleague Glenn Frye obtained some of the first evidence of the annihilation of antiprotons with nucleons in a nuclear emulsion.

Following her retirement from Los Alamos in 1964, Armstrong worked at the Vela Satellite Program. She studied the flux and energy of protons in the lower Van Allen radiation belt.

During her career, Armstrong was active in the American Physical Society. She was elected a Fellow of the society in 1931. In 1942, Armstrong held the office of secretary-treasurer for the New England section of the American Physical Society.

Armstrong died on January 22, 1989. She left $10,000 in her will to the University of New Mexico to establish a scholarship for students who wanted to pursue science teaching in New Mexico.
