= Edward Armstrong (cricketer) =

Australian cricketer

Personal information
- Born: 15 February 1881; Milton, Queensland, Australia
- Died: 28 April 1963 (aged 82); Brisbane, Queensland, Australia
- Source: Cricinfo, 1 October 2020

Edward Armstrong (15 February 1881 – 28 April 1963) was an Australian cricketer. He played in three first-class matches for Queensland between 1905 and 1912.

== See also ==
- List of Queensland first-class cricketers
