= Harry Armstrong (English footballer) =

English footballer

Personal information
- Full name: Harold Arthur Armstrong
- Date of birth: 1885
- Height: 5 ft 7 in (1.70 m)
- Position: Outside right

Senior career*
Years	Team	Apps	(Gls)
- Southwick (Durham)
1907–1909	Sheffield Wednesday	6	(0)
1909–1910	West Ham United	0	(0)
1910–1911	Darlington		(1)
1911–19??	Silksworth C.W.		
- * Club domestic league appearances and goals

Harold Arthur Armstrong (1885 – after 1911) was an English footballer who played as an outside right.

He signed for Sheffield Wednesday from his hometown club, Wearside League champions Southwick, in April 1907. He netted 13 goals for Wednesday's reserve when they won the Midland League in 1908, but made only six first-team appearances for the Owls. He moved on to West Ham United in 1909, but never made an appearance for the first team, and left for Darlington at the end of the season. He played six FA Cup matches for his new club, scoring once, and also scored once in the North-Eastern League, before moving back to the Wearside League with Silksworth Colliery Welfare.
