= Robert Armstrong =

Robert Armstrong may refer to:

== Arts and entertainment ==
- Robert Armstrong (actor) (1890–1973), film actor
- Robert Armstrong (cartoonist) (born 1950), American underground comics artist and musician, coined the term "couch potato"

=== Fictional characters ===
- Robert Armstrong (Home and Away), character in the Australian soap opera
- Robert Armstrong (Noble House), a character from the James Clavell's novel

== Government and military ==
- Robert Armstrong (Australian politician) (born 1952), member of the Tasmanian Legislative Council
- Robert Armstrong (Northern Ireland politician) (1888/9–1961), member of the Senate of Northern Ireland
- Robert Armstrong (military officer) (1792–1854), officer in the United States Army
- Robert Armstrong, Baron Armstrong of Ilminster (1927–2020), British member of the House of Lords and former civil servant
- Robert Baynes Armstrong (1785–1869), British Member of Parliament for Lancaster
- Robert E. Armstrong (1925–2008), American politician from Indiana
- Robert M. Armstrong (1892–1981), American attorney and politician from Nebraska
- Robert P. Armstrong (born 1938), Canadian lawyer and judge

== Other ==
- Robert Armstrong (baseball) (1850–1917), American professional baseball player
- Robert Armstrong (cricketer) (1836–1863), English cricketer
- Robert Armstrong (racehorse trainer) (1944–2021), British racehorse trainer
- Robert Archibald Armstrong (1788–1867), Gaelic lexicographer
- Robert C. Armstrong, chemical engineer at MIT
- Robert John Armstrong (1884–1957), fourth Bishop of Sacramento

== See also ==
- Bob Armstrong (disambiguation)
- Robert Armstrong-Jones (1857–1943), Welsh physician and psychiatrist
- Rob Armstrong (born 1996), Canadian ice sledge hockey player
