= Richard Armstrong =

Richard Armstrong may refer to:

- Richard Armstrong (author) (1903–1986), winner of the 1948 Carnegie medal for children's literature
- Sir Richard Armstrong (British Army officer) (1782–1854), British army officer
- Sir Richard Armstrong (conductor) (born 1943), British conductor
- Richard Armstrong (missionary) (1805–1860), missionary and educator
- Richard Armstrong (museum director) (born 1949), American museum director
- Richard Armstrong (politician) (1815–1880), UK MP for the Irish borough constituency of Sligo, 1865–1868
- Richard Lee Armstrong (1937–1991), American-Canadian geologist

== See also ==
- Dick Armstrong (disambiguation)
