= Dick Armstrong =

Dick Armstrong may refer to:

- Richard Lee Armstrong (1937–1991), American/Canadian geologist
- Dick Armstrong (footballer) (1909–1969), English footballer

== See also ==
- Richard Armstrong (disambiguation)
