= George Armstrong (surveyor) =

Scottish surveyor and cartographer (1843–1910)

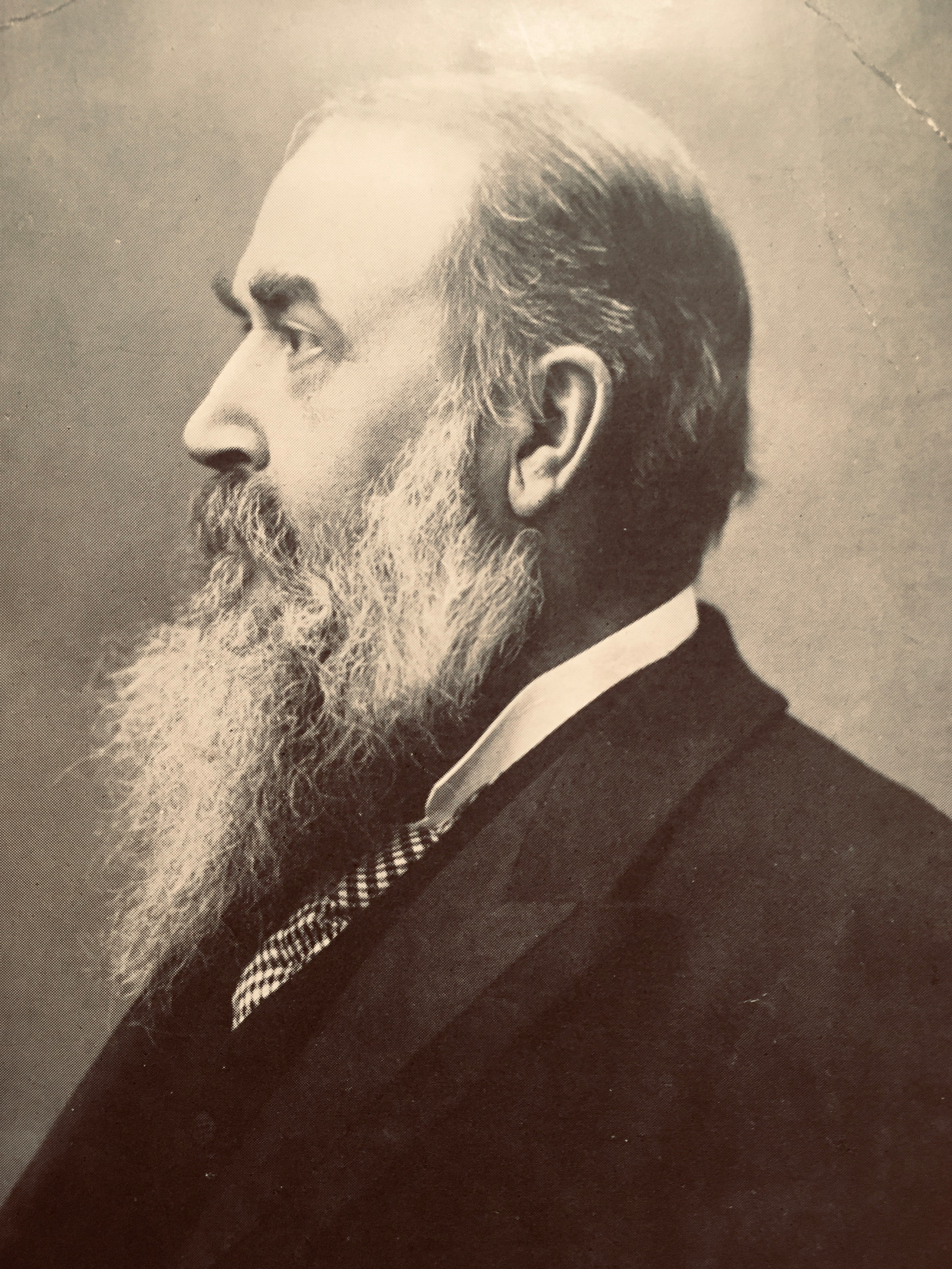
- George Armstrong, Royal Engineer and surveyor
- Born: March 6, 1843; Newcastleton, Roxburghshire, Scotland
- Died: January 7, 1910 (aged 66)
- Occupations: Surveyor, cartographer
- Years active: ca. 1860–1910
- Employer(s): Palestine Exploration Fund; Royal Engineers; Ordnance Survey
- Known for: PEF Survey of Palestine; editing PEF maps and publications
- Notable work: Raised map of Palestine; Names and Places in the Old and New Testament and Apocrypha

George Armstrong (6 March 1843 – 7 January 1910) was a Scottish surveyor who worked with the Palestine Exploration Fund for 38 years. and was part of the PEF Survey of Palestine. Armstrong "played a key role in compiling the PEF's maps and editing the textual publications", and compiled one of the most notable nineteenth-century maps in the history of the cartography of Palestine.

== Biography and career ==
Armstrong was born on 6 March 1843 in Newcastleton, Roxburghshire, Scotland. He joined the Royal Engineers in April 1860 and in 1861 was stationed in Glasgow, working for the Ordnance Survey mapping agency. By 1871 he had been promoted to Second Corporal.

In 1871, Armstrong was part of the party who conducted the Survey of Western Palestine, under Captain Richard Warren Stewart and alongside Charles Frederick Tyrwhitt-Drake. He later worked under Claude Reignier Conder and Herbert Kitchener, who joined the group in 1872 and 1874 respectively. Armstrong is mentioned in Conder and Kitchener's account of the fieldwork, The Survey of Western Palestine (Memoirs of the Topography, Orography, Hydrography, and Archæology). His work is also credited by geologist Edward Hull in Hull's book Mount Seir, Sinai and Western Palestine: Being A Narrative Of A Scientific Expedition. The London Daily News wrote that Armstrong "may be said to know literally every foot of the ground from Dan to Beer-Sheba."

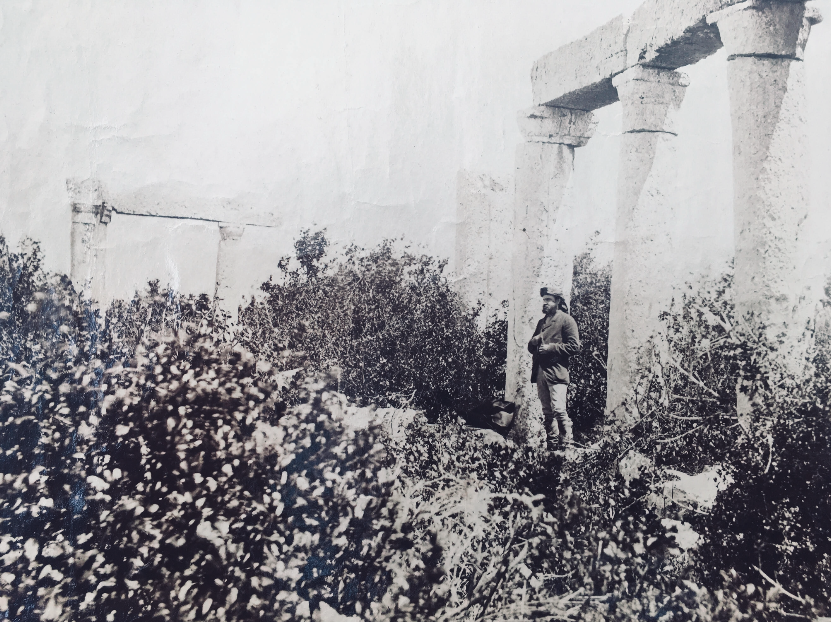
Sergeant George Armstrong at the Belat temple, Lebanon, 1877

In the winter of 1883-4, Armstrong took part in the geological survey of Eastern Palestine.

In 1889, Armstrong published Names and Places in the Old and New Testament and Apocrypha, a guide for identifying locations mentioned in the Old Testament, New Testament, and Biblical apocrypha. Revised by Charles William Wilson, the book has been described as being "central to British colonial toponymic projects in Palestine in the late 19th and first half of the 20th century" by Palestinian writer Nur Masalha.

Armstrong's raised map of Palestine was the first of its kind and won a medal at the Louisiana Purchase Exposition (also known as the St. Louis World's Fair). The map was also displayed at the World's Columbian Exhibition (also known as the Chicago World's Fair), "in the southwest gallery of the Manufacturers’ Building”. The Times wrote of the raised map, "After five years of untiring industry, Mr. George Armstrong, the assistant secretary to the Palestine Exploration Fund, has produced and perfected a work of which he may justly feel proud… Mr Armstrong’s interesting work will faithfully present to those who have had the advantage of touring in Palestine the old familiar routes they have traversed, and will give to those who have yet to enjoy such a journey a clear idea of the sort of country they may expect to see."

He married Matilda Hill in February 1885 and they had five children.

Armstrong had taken over from Walter Besant as the PEF's Acting Secretary in 1887 and remained in post until a few weeks before his death on 7 January 1910.

Armstrong's eldest daughter Maggie (born 1889) assisted him at the Palestine Exploration Fund in his later years. His youngest child Sarah Elizabeth (born 1896) married Gerald Alan Morris in 1920. Gerald was a Staff Officer to Sir Arthur Harris and was awarded the OBE in 1944.

Sarah and Gerald had 3 daughters, the youngest of whom was actress Cherry Morris, born in 1929. Cherry graduated from RADA in 1948 and made her debut with the Royal Shakespeare Company in 1961 as Lady Capulet in a production of Romeo and Juliet directed by Peter Hall. Cherry also had roles in Footballers’ Wives, Poldark and Mapp & Lucia. She was married to actor Mike Murray who was known for The Ipcress File (1965), As You Like It (1963) and Ebony, Ivory & Jade (1976). Cherry and Mike had two children: Luke and actress Emily Swain. Cherry died on 21 July 2005 during the run of The House of Bernarda Alba at the National Theatre.
