= Lynton K. Caldwell =

American political scientist

Lynton Keith Caldwell
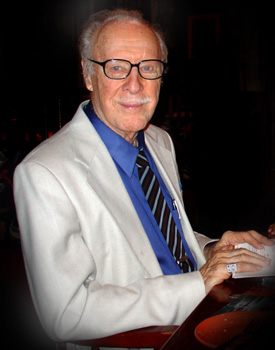
- Born: November 21, 1913; Montezuma, Iowa
- Died: August 15, 2006 (aged 92); Bloomington, Indiana
- Other names: Keith
- Occupation: Professor
- Known for: Invented idea of environmental impact statement in NEPA

Lynton Keith Caldwell (November 21, 1913 – August 15, 2006) was an American political scientist and a principal architect of the 1969 National Environmental Policy Act, the first act of its kind in the world. He was educated at the University of Chicago and spent most of his career at Indiana University Bloomington, where he received tenure in 1956 and retired as Arthur F. Bentley Professor Emeritus of Political Science in 1984. Caldwell was the internationally acclaimed author or coauthor of fifteen books and more than 250 scholarly articles, which may be found in at least 19 different languages. He served on many boards and advisory committees, as a consultant on environmental policy issues worldwide, and received numerous honors and awards.

== Early life and education ==
Caldwell was born in Montezuma, Iowa to Lee Lynton and Alberta (Mace) Caldwell, and died in Bloomington, Indiana, at age 92. He earned his undergraduate degree in English at the University of Chicago in 1934, his Master's degree at Harvard in History and Government in 1938, and his doctoral degree in political science at the University of Chicago in 1943. He married Helen A. Walcher on December 21, 1940 and they raised two children.

== Academic career and public service ==
From 1944 to 1947 he was director of research and publications for The Council of State Governments in Chicago. In 1947 he was appointed professor of political science at the Maxwell School of Citizenship and Public Affairs at Syracuse University. In 1952 and 1953 he was part of U.N. sponsored missions in public administration in Colombia, the Philippines, and Japan. His next one-year U.N. appointment was as co-director of the Public Administration Institute for Turkey and the Middle East in Ankara, Turkey. Indiana University then appointed him director of the Institute of Training for Public Service and Coordinator of Indonesian and Thailand Public Administration Programs. By the time of his retirement, further appointments, research and lecture tours and vacations had enabled him to visit nearly one hundred countries around the world as well as every state in the union. In 1956, after a year as visiting professor of government at the University of California, Berkeley, he returned to Bloomington as Professor of Government at Indiana University, where he remained until his retirement. In the course of his career he secured 21 National Science Foundation grants to support his research.

During his career, Caldwell served on the faculties of the University of Chicago, Northwestern University, the University of Oklahoma, Syracuse University, and the University of California at Berkeley, and had shorter appointments at some 80 other collegiate institutions both within the U.S. and overseas. At various times, Caldwell served as advisor or consultant to the U.S. Senate, UNESCO, the United Nations, the Departments of Commerce, Energy, Defense, and Interior, and the National Institutes of Health. Although not a natural scientist, as part of his work towards establishing interdisciplinary study in universities and achieving a greater merging of the two worlds of science and public policy, he became deeply involved in national and international environmental affairs and worked closely with several important scientific bodies serving, among many appointments, on the Sea Grant Program of the National Oceanic and Atmospheric Administration (NOAA), the first Environmental Advisory Board of the United States Army Corps of Engineers, the Pacific Science Congress, the President’s National Commission on Materials Policy, the Science Advisory Board for the Great Lakes of the International Joint Commission, as chair of the first Commission on Environmental Policy, Law and Administration for the International Union for the Conservation of Nature and Natural Resources (IUCN), and as advisor to the UNESCO Man and the Biosphere Program (MAB), and the UNESCO working program for the environmental education and training of engineers.

He also served on the editorial boards of numerous prestigious scientific and professional journals. A lover of nature, bird watching, and botany from an early age, he was a founding member of the South Bend, Indiana chapter of the Audubon Society, and of both the first local chapter of The Nature Conservancy (TNC) in New York, and the Conservancy's Indiana Chapter. He served on the Board of Governors of TNC from 1959 to 1965.

== Notable accomplishments ==
During the 1960s Caldwell was virtually a lone voice in attempting to establish policies for the environment because such a holistic and interdisciplinary approach to solving environmental problems did not then exist. In 1962 his groundbreaking article “Environment: A New Focus for Public Policy?” appeared in Public Administration Review, launching development of a new subfield of environmental policy studies. After 1962, he changed the main focus of his career towards examining policies for protecting the quality of the human environment. In 1972 he was the catalyst for founding the School of Public and Environmental Affairs (SPEA) at Indiana University, Bloomington. His 1976 article "Novus Ordo Seclorum: The Heritage of American Public Administration" in Public Administration Review was a defining paper in the modern history of public administration.

Caldwell is perhaps best known as one of the principal architects of the National Environmental Policy Act (NEPA), the first act of its kind in the world, signed into law on January 1, 1970. Much of the impulse for Caldwell's broad approach came from his experience watching flawed international development work while overseas in the 1950s and 1960s. In drafting A National Policy on the Environment in 1968 as consultant to Senator Henry Jackson, the head of the powerful Senate Interior and Insular Affairs Committee, Caldwell realized that more was needed than a mere a policy statement: an “action-forcing mechanism” would be necessary to secure federal agency compliance with the Act’s requirements. The origin of the requirement for preparation of an environmental impact statement (EIS) has been attributed to Caldwell, whose testimony at the Senate hearing in April 1969 laid the groundwork for inclusion of provisions requiring an evaluation of the effects of all major federal projects significantly affecting the quality of the human environment. In these “detailed statements,” as they were termed in the Act, all reasonably foreseeable social, economic, and environmental effects of a proposed action and any possible alternatives to it must be identified and assessed before any federal action takes place.

NEPA has been emulated, in one form or another, by more than one hundred other countries, and many states have also established “mini NEPAs.” When national government agencies first started to prepare EISs, there were no professional associations dedicated to the planning and problem solving that NEPA demanded. Subsequently, Caldwell's efforts in formulating NEPA, and later promoting it, led to formation of the National Association of Environmental Professionals (NAEP), a national professional association of persons who prepare EISs.

== Honors and awards ==
The many awards Caldwell received included the William E. Mosher Award (1964) and the Marshall E. Dimock Award of the American Society for Public Administration (1981); the John M. Gaus Award from the American Political Science Association; the Harold and Margaret Sprout Award (1985), and the National Environmental Quality Award from the Natural Resources Council of America (1997). In 1991, he was named one of the United Nations Environmental Program's (UNEP) Global 500 for distinguished environmental services, and in 1997, he was awarded an honorary LLD from Western Michigan University. In 2001 he was the recipient of Indiana University's Distinguished Service Award. He was a Fellow of the Royal Society of Arts, and an honorary member of the International Association for Impact Assessment. Annually since 1995 the American Political Science Association has awarded the Lynton Keith Caldwell Prize for the best book in environmental politics and policy published during the previous three years. Shortly after his death in 2006, the Caldwell Center for Culture and Ecology was established in Bloomington, IN to provide environmental education for youth and adults.

== Scholarly publications ==
- The administrative theories of Hamilton & Jefferson: Their contribution to thought on public administration. New York: Russell & Russell, 1944.
- The government and administration of New York. New York: Crowell, 1954.
- Environment: A challenge for modern society. Garden City, NY: Natural History Press, 1970. Published for the American Museum of Natural History.
- In defense of earth: International protection of the biosphere. Bloomington: Indiana University Press, 1972.
- Man and his environment: Policy and administration. New York: Harper & Row, 1975. ISBN 978-0-06-041147-3
- Citizens and the environment: Case studies in popular action. With Lynton R. Hayes and Isabel M. MacWhirter. Bloomington: Indiana University Press, 1976. ISBN 978-0-253-31355-3
- Science and the National Environmental Policy Act: Redirecting policy through procedural reform. University, AL: University of Alabama Press, 1982. ISBN 978-0-8173-0112-5
- US interests and the global environment. Muscatine, IA: Stanley Foundation, 1985.
- Biocracy: Public policy and the life sciences. Boulder: Westview Press, 1987. ISBN 978-0-8133-7363-8
- Perspectives on ecosystem management for the Great Lakes: A reader. Albany: State University of New York Press, 1988. ISBN 978-0-88706-765-5
- Between two worlds: Science, the environmental movement, and policy choice. New York : Cambridge University Press, 1990. ISBN 978-0-521-33152-4.
- International environmental policy: Emergence and dimensions, 2d ed. Durham: Duke University Press, 1990. ISBN 978-0-8223-1058-7
- "Globalizing environmentalism: Threshold of a new phase in international relations. In: American Environmentalism: The U.S. environmental movement, 1970-1990, Riley E. Dunlap and Angela G. Mertig, eds. New York: Taylor & Francis, 1992. ISBN 0-8448-1730-9
- Policy for land: Law and ethics. With Karen S. Shrader-Frechette. Lanham, MD: Rowman & Littlefield Publishers, 1993. ISBN 978-0-8476-7778-8
- Environment as a focus for public policy. With Robert V. Bartlett and James N. Gladden. College Station: Texas A & M University Press, 1995.
- International environmental policy: From the twentieth to the twenty-first century, 3d ed. With Paul S. Weiland. Durham: Duke University Press, 1996. ISBN 978-0-8223-1861-3
- Environmental policy: Transnational issues and national trends. With Robert V. Bartlett. Westport, CT: Quorum Books, 1997. ISBN 978-1-56720-079-9
- The National Environmental Policy Act: An agenda for the future. Bloomington: Indiana University Press, 1998. ISBN 978-0-253-33444-2
