= Neil Armstrong (disambiguation) =

Neil Armstrong (1930–2012) was an American astronaut and the first person to walk on the Moon.

Neil Armstrong may also refer to:

== People ==
- Neil J. Armstrong (1920–1994), Canadian aviator
- Neill Armstrong (1926–2016), American football player and coach
- Neil Armstrong (ice hockey) (1932–2020), Canadian hockey player
- Neil Armstrong, writer from Adam's Family Tree

== Other uses ==
- RV Neil Armstrong (AGOR-27), a class of oceanographic research ship
- Neil Armstrong Airport, in New Knoxville, Ohio
- Neil Armstrong Observatory, in Nicaragua
- Neil A. Armstrong Flight Research Center, inside Edwards Air Force Base in California
- Neil A. Armstrong Test Facility, in Erie County, Ohio
- Neil Armstrong Operations and Checkout Building, on Merritt Island, Florida
- Neil Armstrong Hall of Engineering, at Purdue University in Indiana
- Neil Armstrong Elementary School, part of Charlotte County Public Schools, Florida
- Neil Armstrong Air and Space Museum , in Wapakoneta, Ohio
- Neil Armstrong Lunar Outpost, a proposed outpost on the Moon
- Neil Armstrong Achievement, a cadet achievement award of the Civil Air Patrol
