= Arkeria Rose Armstrong =

Australian Aboriginal artist

- Born: 1988 (age 37–38); Ceduna, South Australia
- Education: La Trobe Bendigo

Arkeria Rose Armstrong is an Aboriginal artist of the Gamilaraay nation. Having a childhood spent traversing the Australian outback in a caravan, Armstrong later obtained a teaching degree before an offer from a Danish art gallery owner resulted in her official artistic debut in 2015. Her work is heavily based on inspiration from her grandparents, one a traditional dots in ochre painter and the other one of the last sand painters in New South Wales.

After her initial exhibition titled Strong Connection in the Aboriginal Art Gallery in Rotterdam, the opening presentation for her work having been done by the Australian ambassador to the Netherlands, Armstrong's pieces were exhibited in several other art galleries across Australia in the years since. However, her pieces continue to be exhibited in aboriginal art galleries in the Netherlands as well.

== Childhood and education ==
Born in Ceduna, South Australia in 1988, Armstrong's father decided to become a gold prospector when she was seven, resulting in her spending several years of her childhood in a caravan traveling across the Australian outback. Her mother, Stephanie Armstrong, was a teacher that homeschooled her and her sister while they were traveling to ensure they still obtained a solid education. The family eventually sold the caravan after four years and moved to Broome, Australia where Armstrong went to high school. During that same time period, she had a job as a pearl farmer. She later graduated from La Trobe Bendigo with a degree in teaching.

== Art and style ==
The artistic style Armstrong developed was based on what she learned from her grandparents, with her grandfather's style, a Yorta Yorta painter named Don Briggs, focusing on "dots painted in ochre". Her Gamilaraay grandmother, Rose Fernando, was a sand painter of only a few that remain in New South Wales and she used her painting style alongside storytelling through the sand drawn images. Armstrong's version of the style uses the dots method combined with bright colors to represent the "natural landscapes of Australia" and the cultural history of her people. Her paintings seek to evoke the stories that her grandmother told and her inspirations from past Aboriginal artists, such as Emily Kame Kngwarreye. Including paintings, she also produces bracelets, pendants, and earrings with her dot style on the exterior.

== Career ==
After receiving her university degree and traveling in Kimberley in 2015, Armstrong happened to meet Michel Arends, gallery owner of the Aboriginal Art Gallery in Rotterdam, and he invited her to present her first solo exhibition at his family's gallery. She completed a 30-piece collection titled Strong Connection for the exhibition, with one of her landscapes of the New South Wales region being the primary feature. The exhibition of her work was opened by Brett Mason, the Australian ambassador to the Netherlands at the time.

She then spent the summer of 2016 on a collection of paintings commissioned by the town of Alice Springs and featuring images of the Pilbara landscape. That same year, an Exhibit B gallery was set up for a month in Bendigo, Victoria and established by the city coordinator, with Armstrong being one of the featured artists. In October 2017, a new exhibition of her work titled Black Soil was shown at the Dudley House gallery in Bendigo, Victoria, focusing on the agricultural soil of Gamilaraay country. One of twenty-one Aboriginal artists involved in the Stories and Structures – New Connections exhibition hosted by Microscopy Australia in 2018, Armstrong's work focused on artistically representing the beauty of microscopic images.

She was one of the artists represented in the 2019 Marking the Infinite: Contemporary Women Artists from Aboriginal Australia exhibition held by the Museum of Anthropology at UBC. She also partnered with the company Occulture to have jewelry developed with her paintings on them. Her work has also been featured at the Aboriginal Art Amsterdam gallery, such as her piece Miyamiyaa (Several Girls) in 2022, which represents the Seven Sisters constellation and its importance in Aboriginal folklore.

== Personal life ==
Armstrong lives in the region of the Djadjawurrung people in Bendigo, Victoria with her husband and daughter.
