= Brad Armstrong =

Brad Armstrong may refer to:

- Brad Armstrong (director) (born 1965), pornographic actor and director
- Brad Armstrong (wrestler) (1961–2012), ring name of Bradley James
- Brad Armstrong (Coronation Street), a character from the British soap opera Coronation Street
- Brad Armstrong (Home and Away), a character from the Australian soap opera Home and Away
- Brad Armstrong, the protagonist of LISA: The Painful RPG
