= Thomas Armstrong (Nottinghamshire cricketer) =

British cricketer

Personal information
- Full name: Thomas Armstrong
- Born: 16 March 1872; Keyworth, Nottinghamshire, England
- Died: 5 July 1938 (aged 66); Keyworth, Nottinghamshire, England
- Batting: Right-handed
- Bowling: Right-arm medium

Domestic team information
- Years: Team
- 1892–1896: Nottinghamshire

Career statistics
Competition	First-class
Matches	6
Runs scored	67
Batting average	7.44
100s/50s	–/–
Top score	20*
Balls bowled	–
Wickets	–
Bowling average	–
5 wickets in innings	–
10 wickets in match	–
Best bowling	–
Catches/stumpings	1/–
- Source: Cricinfo, 3 October 2010

Thomas Armstrong (16 March 1872 – 5 July 1938) was an English first-class cricketer. Armstrong was a right-handed batsman who bowled right-arm medium pace. He was born in Keyworth, Nottinghamshire.

Armstrong made his first-class debut for Nottinghamshire against the Marylebone Cricket Club in 1892. From 1892 to 1896, he represented the county in 6 first-class matches, the last of which came against the Marylebone Cricket Club during the 1896 season. In his 6 first-class matches, he scored 67 runs at a batting average of 7.44, with a high score of 20*.

He died at the town of his birth on 5 July 1938.

Thomas Armstrong came from a sporting family. His brother Jack Armstrong played football for Nottingham Forest and another brother Albert played for Forest Reserves on several occasions.
