= Margaret Armstrong =

Margaret Armstrong may refer to:

- Margaret Neilson Armstrong (1867–1944), American author, designer and illustrator
- Margaret Armstrong, see Ottawa South (provincial electoral district)
- Margaret Armstrong (actress) in Annie Oakley (1935 film)
- Margaret Armstrong (geostatistician) (born 1950)

== See also ==
- Peggy Armstrong (disambiguation)
