= Elizabeth Armstrong =

Elizabeth Armstrong may refer to:

- Elizabeth Armstrong (water polo) (born 1983), American water polo player
- Elizabeth Armstrong (artist) (1859–1930), Australian artist and educator
- Bess Armstrong (born 1953), American film and television actress
- Elizabeth Armstrong (settler) (1798–1857), American settler in Illinois
- Elizabeth Armstrong Reed (1842–1915), American Oriental scholar
- Elizabeth Armstrong (curator), American curator of contemporary and modern art
- Izzy Armstrong, Elizabeth Armstrong, fictional character
