= Henry Armstrong (disambiguation) =

Henry Armstrong (1912–1988) was an American boxer

Henry Armstrong may also refer to:

- Henry W. Armstrong (1879–1951), American boxer and composer
- Henry Edward Armstrong (1848–1937), English chemist
- Henry Armstrong (umpire) (1885–1945), Australian cricket Test match umpire
- Henry Armstrong (Northern Ireland politician) (1844–1943), Northern Irish politician
- Henry Armstrong (Idaho politician), member of the Idaho House of Representatives

== See also ==
- Harry Armstrong (disambiguation)
