= Chris Armstrong (footballer, born 1984) =

English footballer

Personal information
- Full name: Christopher David Armstrong
- Date of birth: 8 November 1984 (age 41)
- Place of birth: Durham, England
- Height: 6 ft 2 in (1.88 m)
- Position: Striker

Senior career*
Years	Team	Apps	(Gls)
2003–2004	Leeds United	0	(0)
2004	Rochdale	0	(0)
2004–2005	Queen of the South	6	(0)
2005–2006	Stockport County	11	(1)
2006–2007	St Patrick's Athletic	6	(1)
2007	Galway United	4	(0)
- * Club domestic league appearances and goals

Christopher David Armstrong (born 8 November 1984) is an English former footballer.

== Club career ==
Armstrong started his career at Leeds United and featured for the reserves before being released by the club in May 2004. He joined Rochdale soon after before signing for Scottish First Division club Queen of the South in August.

He joined Galway United, having previously played with St Patrick's Athletic since July 2005. His previous clubs include Rochdale, Queen of the South and Stockport County.

He was released by Galway United in 2007.
