= William Armstrong (cricketer) =

Australian cricketer

Personal information
- Born: 2 May 1886; Milton, Queensland, Australia
- Died: 29 May 1955 (aged 69); Brisbane, Queensland, Australia
- Source: Cricinfo, 1 October 2020

William Armstrong (2 May 1886 – 29 May 1955) was an Australian cricketer. He played in five first-class matches for Queensland between 1907 and 1912.

== See also ==
- List of Queensland first-class cricketers
