= Dorsey Armstrong =

American medievalist (born 1970)

S. Dorsey "Dorrie" Armstrong (born 1970) is an American Arthurian scholar who is a Professor of English and Medieval Literature at Purdue University. Before joining the English department at Purdue in 2002, she taught at Centenary College of Louisiana and California State University, Long Beach. Her research interests include medieval women writers; late medieval print culture; and the Arthurian legend.

== Education ==
Armstrong holds a B.A. in English literature and creative writing at Stanford University and a Ph.D. in medieval literature at Duke University.

== Works ==
Her book Gender and the Chivalric Community in Sir Thomas Malory's "Morte d'Arthur" was published by University Press of Florida in 2003, and widely reviewed. Her translation of Sir Thomas Malory's Morte Darthur: A Modern English Translation, was published by Parlor Press in 2009, has been reviewed and is held in over 4500 WorldCat libraries. She became editor in chief of the academic journal Arthuriana in January 2009. Armstrong's work Mapping Malory: Regional Identities and National Geographies in Le Morte Darthur, written in collaboration with Kenneth Hodges, explores the role played by geography in Malory's works. Armstrong has won numerous awards for rigorous and engaged teaching style. She has taped six lecture series for The Teaching Company, five of them on the medieval world and another on writing.

== Personal life ==
Armstrong is the daughter of former Seattle Mariners president, Purdue and Stanford alumnus, Chuck Armstrong.
