= Joseph Armstrong (footballer) =

English footballer

Personal information
- Full name: Joseph Williams Armstrong
- Date of birth: 10 October 1892
- Place of birth: Blaydon
- Date of death: 15 May 1966 (aged 73)
- Position: Forward

Youth career
- 1911: Hedgefield
- 1912–1913: Scotswood

Senior career*
Years	Team	Apps	(Gls)
1913–1921	Portsmouth	94	(35)
1921	Sheffield Wednesday	7	(0)
1921	Norwich City	22	(8)
1921–1922	Clapton		
1922	Scotswood		
1923	Boscombe	29	(2)
1924	Portsmouth Tramways		
Medal record
First place	Southern Football League	1920
First place	Hampshire Senior Cup	1913
- * Club domestic league appearances and goals

Joseph Williams Armstrong (10 October 1892 – 14 May 1966) was an English professional footballer who played at Inside Left for Portsmouth, Sheffield Wednesday and Norwich City.

== Sources ==
- Mike Davage, John Eastwood, Kevin Platt (2001). Canary Citizens. Jarrold Publishing. ISBN 0-7117-2020-7.
