= Bob Armstrong (Australian footballer) =

Australian rules footballer

Personal information
- Full name: Robert Daniel Armstrong
- Born: 25 July 1872; Melbourne
- Died: 3 June 1951 (aged 78); Prahran, Victoria
- Original team: North Melbourne juniors
- Height: 170 cm (5 ft 7 in)
- Weight: 61 kg (134 lb)
- Position: Wing

Playing career^{1}
Years	Club	Games (Goals)
1897–98	Carlton	12 (0)
- ^{1} Playing statistics correct to the end of 1898.

Robert Daniel Armstrong (25 July 1872 – 3 June 1951) was an Australian rules footballer who played with Carlton in the Victorian Football Association (VFA) and the Victorian Football League (VFL).
