= Alexander Armstrong (rugby union) =

- Born: Alexander R. Armstrong; 6 September 1897 Warren, New South Wales, Australia
- Died: 30 November 1973 (aged 76)

Rugby union career
- Position: number eight
International career
Years	Team	Apps	(Points)
1923	Wallabies	2	(0)

Alexander R. Armstrong (6 September 1897 – 30 November 1973) was a rugby union player who represented Australia.

Armstrong, a number eight, claimed a total of 2 international rugby caps for Australia.
