= Mary Armstrong =

Mary Armstrong may refer to:

- Mary Carew (Mary Louise Carew Armstrong, 1913–2002), American athlete
- Mary Ann Armstrong (1838–1910), British botanical fern artist
