= Tim Armstrong (disambiguation) =

Tim Armstrong (born 1965) is an American musician and songwriter.

Tim Armstrong may also refer to:

- Tim Armstrong (cricketer) (born 1990), Australian cricketer
- Tim Armstrong (executive) (born 1970), founder and CEO of dtx, former CEO of AOL and Oath Inc.
- Tim Armstrong (politician) (1875–1942), New Zealand politician of the Labour Party
- Tim Armstrong (ice hockey) (born 1967), Canadian ice hockey player
- Tim Armstrong (writer) (born 1967), Gaelic singer and novelist
- Tim Armstrong, a character from the TV series Scorpion
