= Chris Armstrong (political theorist) =

British political theorist

- Known for: Global justice, environmental politics, natural resource theory
- Awards: Lynton Keith Caldwell Prize (2023)

Academic background
- Education: University of Durham; University of Amsterdam (Erasmus); London School of Economics; University of Bristol
- Thesis: (2001)
- Doctoral advisor: Judith Squires

Academic work
- Discipline: Political theory
- Institutions: University of Southampton
- Notable works: A Blue New Deal (2022); Global Justice and the Biodiversity Crisis (2024)

Chris Armstrong FaCSS is a British political theorist. His books include A Blue New Deal (2022), which won the American Political Science Association's 2023 Lynton Keith Caldwell Prize, and Global Justice and the Biodiversity Crisis (2024), which was shortlisted for the Royal Institute of Philosophy's Al-Rodhan International Prize for Transdisciplinary Philosophy. He is a professor of political theory at the University of Southampton, where he has worked since 2005.

== Career ==
Armstrong read for a Bachelor of Arts degree in politics at the University of Durham (with an Erasmus year at the University of Amsterdam) from 1992 to 1996. He went on to read for a Master of Science degree at the London School of Economics from 1996 to 1997, and then a PhD in politics at the University of Bristol from 1998 to 2001. At Bristol, he was supervised by Judith Squires, and his thesis (entitled Complex equality and sexual inequality) was examined by Anne Phillips.

Armstrong undertook an Economic and Social Research Council-funded postdoctoral fellowship at the University of Bristol from 2001 to 2002, and then worked as a temporary lecturer in political theory at University College Dublin from 2002 to 2003. He moved to Queen's University Belfast as a lecturer in politics in 2003, and then joined the University of Southampton as a lecturer in 2005. Armstrong's first book was Rethinking Equality: The Challenge of Equal Citizenship, published in 2006 by Manchester University Press. He was promoted to senior lecturer in 2007, then reader in 2011. The following year, his Global Distributive Justice: An Introduction was published by Cambridge University Press. He was promoted to professor in 2013.

Armstrong's Justice and Natural Resources: An Egalitarian Theory was published in 2017 by Oxford University Press. This was reviewed in several academic journals, and was the subject of a special issue of the journal Global Justice: Theory Practice Rhetoric. In the book, Armstrong offers an account of the concept of natural resource that Clare Heyward and Laura Lo Coco described in 2021 as "the most comprehensive and systematic ... to date". In contrast to previous political philosophical accounts of the ownership of natural resources, Armstrong argues for a property view that is "disaggregated" (meaning that agents can have property-like rights over natural resources without possessing "full ownership" of them) and argues that agents can have special claims over particular natural resources on the grounds that they have improved those resources and on the grounds that they are attached to those resources. As the title of the book suggests, Armstrong's account is egalitarian, but he does not call for equal distribution of resources. Instead, he is concerned with "equal access to wellbeing". Why Global Justice Matters: Moral Progress in a Divided World, published by Polity Press, followed in 2019.

In 2022, Armstrong published A Blue New Deal: Why We Need A New Politics for the Ocean with Yale University Press. The book attracted considerable press attention, including being named one of New Statesman's Books of the Year for 2022. Armstrong calls for a "Blue New Deal", a new politics of the sea offering the prospect of ecological resilience and a just blue economy. Armstrong's central practical proposal is the need for a "World Ocean Authority" to oversee the high seas. The book won the 2023 Lynton Keith Caldwell Prize from the American Political Science Association, awarded for "the best book on environmental politics and policy published in the past three years".

Armstrong's Global Justice and the Biodiversity Crisis: Conservation in a World of Inequality, from Oxford University Press, was published in 2024. The book was shortlisted for the Royal Institute of Philosophy's Al-Rodhan International Prize for Transdisciplinary Philosophy alongside Shannon Vallor's The AI Mirror and Mazviita Chirimuuta's The Brain Abstracted, the latter of which won.

In September 2026, Armstrong was named as a Fellow of the Academy of Social Sciences.

== Popular writing ==
Armstrong has written for The Guardian and the London Review of Books. He is represented by Matthew Turner at the Rogers, Coleridge and White literary agency.

== Selected bibliography ==
- Armstrong, Chris (2006). Rethinking Equality: The Challenge of Equal Citizenship. Manchester: Manchester University Press.
- Stoker, Gerry, Andrew Mason, Anthony McGrew, Chris Armstrong, David Owen, Graham Smith, Momoh Banya, Derek McGhee, and Clare Saunders (2011). Prospects for Citizenship. London: Bloomsbury Academic.
- Armstrong, Chris (2012). Global Distributive Justice: An Introduction. Cambridge: Cambridge University Press.
- Armstrong, Chris, and Andrew Mason, eds. (2013). Democratic Citizenship and Its Futures. Abingdon: Routledge.
- Armstrong, Chris (2017). Justice and Natural Resources: An Egalitarian Theory. Oxford: Oxford University Press.
- Armstrong, Chris (2019). Why Global Justice Matters: Moral Progress in a Divided World. Cambridge: Polity.
- Armstrong, Chris (2022). A Blue New Deal: Why We Need A New Politics for the Ocean. New Haven and London: Yale University Press.
- Armstrong, Chris (2024). Global Justice and the Biodiversity Crisis: Conservation in a World of Inequality. Oxford: Oxford University Press.
