= The Armstrong Twins =

Floyd and Lloyd Armstrong in 1947, at the beginning of their country music career.

The Armstrong Twins were a bluegrass and country duo consisting of the twins Floyd and Lloyd Armstrong. They were born on January 24, 1930, in De Witt, Arkansas to a musical family, and active mostly in the 1940s and 1950s.

They were one of several brother duos of their era, of which they were the only twins. Initially they both played guitar; but after randomly picking an instrument at a pawn shop in 1938 at his father's behest ("It's a wonder I didn't pick a tuba"), Lloyd started to play the mandolin and sing harmony, while Floyd played the guitar and sang lead.

Their biggest hit is the Mandolin Boogie. They became active again in the 1980s.

Recording of the Stuck up Blues, followed by the Mandolin Booglie and then by a fiddle tune Bill Cheatum, by the Armstrong Twins. Harold Hensley was the announcer on a show called Hometown Jamboree on July 4, 1949.
