= Peter Armstrong =

Peter Armstrong may refer to:

- Peter Armstrong (journalist), Canadian journalist
- Peter Armstrong (poet) (born 1957), British poet
- Peter Armstrong (rugby league) (1936–2019), Australian rugby league footballer
- Peter William Armstrong (born 1943), television and radio producer
- Peter Armstrong (priest) (1929–2009), priest for the 49'ers
