= Joe Armstrong (footballer) =

English footballer

Personal information
- Full name: Joseph Michael Armstrong
- Date of birth: 29 January 1939 (age 87)
- Place of birth: Newcastle upon Tyne, England
- Position: Inside forward

Youth career
- Leslie Boys Club

Senior career*
Years	Team	Apps	(Gls)
1957–1959	Leeds United	0	(0)
1959–1960	Gateshead	22	(9)
- * Club domestic league appearances and goals

Joseph Michael Armstrong (born 29 January 1939) is an English former footballer who played as an inside forward.

Armstrong started his career with Leslie Boys Club before joining Leeds United in 1957. He moved on to Gateshead in 1959 without making an appearance for Leeds United. Armstrong made 23 appearances for Gateshead in the league and FA Cup, scoring 10 goals.

== Sources ==
- "allfootballers.com". Archived from the original on 5 April 2010.
- "Post War English & Scottish Football League A–Z Player's Transfer Database".
