= Ian Armstrong =

Ian Armstrong may refer to:

- Ian Armstrong (politician) (1937–2020), Australian politician, deputy premier of New South Wales
- Ian Armstrong (artist) (1923–2005), Australian classical modernist painter and print maker
- Ian Armstrong (footballer) (born 1981), English football player
