= William Armstrong (rugby league) =

English rugby league footballer

Personal information
- Full name: William A. Armstrong

Playing information
- Position: Hooker, Second-row
Club
Years	Team	Pld	T	G	FG	P
1920–22/23	Wakefield Trinity	62	1	0	0	3

William A. Armstrong was a professional rugby league footballer who played in the 1920s. He played at club level for Wakefield Trinity, as a hooker or second-row.

== Notable tour matches ==
William Armstrong played hooker in Wakefield Trinity's 3–29 defeat by Australia in the 1921–22 Kangaroo tour of Great Britain match at Belle Vue, Wakefield on Saturday 22 October 1921.
