= James Armstrong (footballer, born 1892) =

English footballer

Personal information
- Date of birth: 10 October 1892
- Place of birth: Blaydon, County Durham, England
- Date of death: 1966 (aged 73–74)
- Position: Centre forward

Senior career*
Years	Team	Apps	(Gls)
- Scotswood
1913–1921	Portsmouth	78	(31)
- Sheffield Wednesday
- * Club domestic league appearances and goals

James Armstrong (10 October 1892 – 1966) was a professional footballer who played as a centre forward.
