= Jim Armstrong =

Jim or Jimmy Armstrong may refer to:

- Jimmy Armstrong (footballer, born 1899) (1899–1971), played for Barnsley, Bournemouth, Chester-le-Street and Stalybridge Celtic
- Jimmy Armstrong (footballer, born 1901) (1901–1977), played for Chelsea, Tottenham, Luton and Bristol Rovers
- Jimmy Armstrong (footballer, born 1904) (1904–1971), played for Clapton Orient, QPR and Watford
- Jim Armstrong (wrestler) (1917–1981), Australian Olympic wrestler and rugby league player
- Jim Armstrong (guitarist) (born 1944), Northern Ireland guitarist
- Jim Armstrong (curler) (born 1950), Canadian and wheelchair curler from British Columbia
- Jim Armstrong (sports journalist), sportswriter for the Denver Post

== See also ==
- James Armstrong (disambiguation)
