= Chuck Armstrong =

American baseball executive

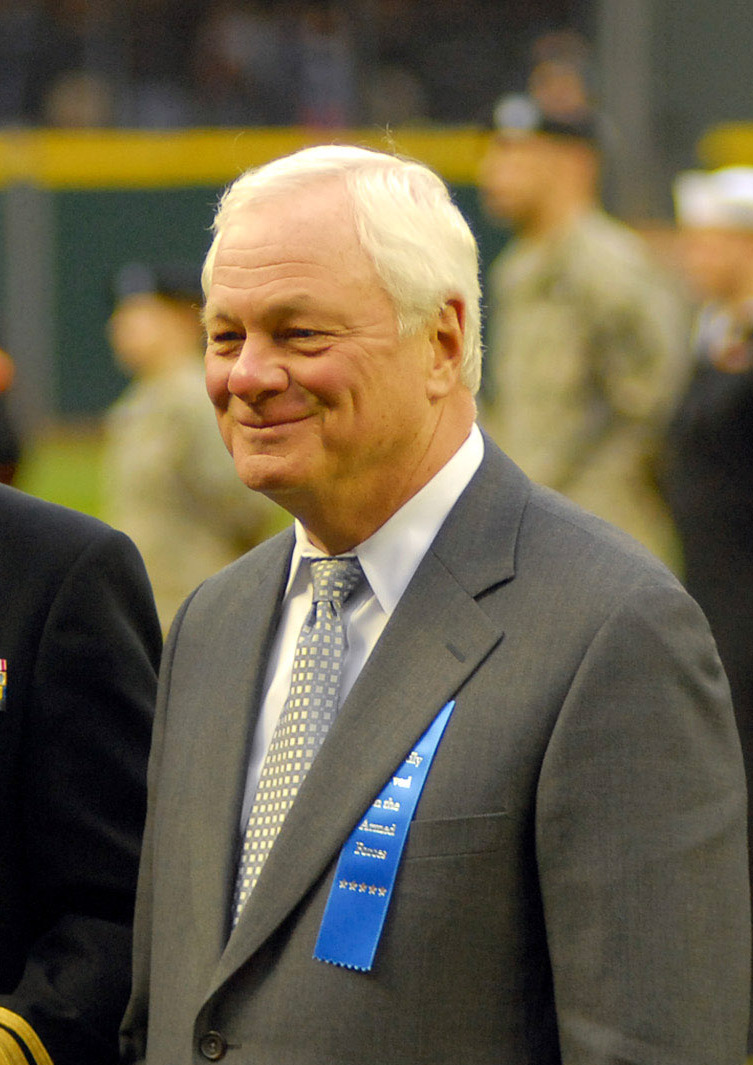
- Armstrong in 2007.

President of Seattle Mariners
- In office 1993 – January 31, 2014
- Preceded by: Gary Kaseff
- Succeeded by: Kevin Mather
- In office 1983–1989
- Preceded by: Dan O'Brien Sr.
- Succeeded by: Gary Kaseff

Personal details
- Education: Purdue University; Stanford Law School

Military service
- Allegiance: United States
- Branch/service: United States Navy

Charles G. Armstrong is an American attorney and former United States Navy officer, best known for his 28-year tenure as president of the Seattle Mariners Major League Baseball club, a position from which he stepped down in January 2014.

== Early life and education ==
Armstrong was born in Louisville, Kentucky. In 1964, he earned a Bachelor of Science degree in Industrial Engineering from Purdue University. He initiated into Tau Beta Pi (the National Engineering Honor Society) that same year. He studied law at Stanford University, completing his Juris Doctor in 1967. Shortly after graduation, Armstrong began his three-year career in the navy.

== Seattle Mariners ==
Armstrong was employed as general counsel for George Argyros' California real estate business when the latter purchased the Mariners from the team's original ownership group, led by entertainer Danny Kaye, in 1981. Argyros immediately brought Armstrong to Seattle as the team's president. During 1987 and 1988, Argyros was attempting to purchase the San Diego Padres and sell the Mariners to several possible out-of-state investors, one of whom intended to move the team to Miami. Armstrong attempted to organize a group of Seattle-based investors with the intention of keeping the team in Seattle; however, citing a conflict of interest, Argyros instructed him to "back away" from his efforts. The Mariners were eventually sold to Indiana businessman Jeff Smulyan in 1989, and Armstrong was let go.

Armstrong worked for several Seattle companies as a consultant from 1989 to 1992, and was interim athletic director for the University of Washington Huskies, during 1991. In 1991, after Smulyan had put the team up for sale and rumors persisted that they would relocate to the Tampa Bay area, Armstrong was recruited by then-U.S. Senator Slade Gorton to aid in efforts keep the Mariners in Seattle. He was a consultant to Seattle-area business leader John Ellis while The Baseball Club of Seattle (led by Nintendo chairman Hiroshi Yamauchi) was negotiating to purchase the team. Major League Baseball stipulated that, as a condition of allowing the team's sale to a group with foreign majority investors, "North American interests" were to run the club's day-to-day operations. The sale was approved in June 1992. Armstrong was brought back as the team's president in 1993, with Ellis as CEO and representing the team's ownership group, a role filled by former Nintendo of America executive Howard Lincoln since Ellis' retirement in 2000.

On November 25, 2013, Armstrong announced that he would retire from his position as president and COO of the Mariners. January 31, 2014, was his last day as the Mariners' president.

== Personal life ==
Armstrong is married and has three children. His son, also named Chuck, was the Stanford Tree in 2001. His daughter is Dorsey Armstrong, a professor in the English Department at Purdue University who specializes in medieval literature.

Preceded by Dan O'Brien Sr.	Seattle Mariners President; 1983–1989	Succeeded by Gary Kaseff (assumed office in 1991)
Preceded by Gary Kaseff	Seattle Mariners President; 1993 – January 31, 2014	Succeeded by Kevin Mather
