= Martin Armstrong =

Martin Armstrong may refer to:

- Martin Armstrong (writer) (1882–1974), English writer and poet
- Martin Armstrong (surveyor) (1739–1802), soldier in the American Revolution, surveyor in Tennessee
- Martin A. Armstrong (born 1949), American financial analyst and convicted felon
- Martin Armstrong Martin (1910–1963), American civil rights attorney
