= Charles F. Armstrong (Illinois politician) =

American politician and lawyer

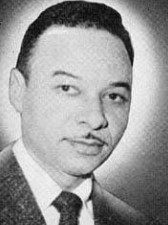

Member of the Illinois House of Representatives
- In office 1957 – March 9, 1965

Personal details
- Born: May 25, 1919 Statesville, North Carolina
- Died: March 9, 1965 (aged 45)
- Education: John Marshall Law School

Military service
- Allegiance: United States
- Branch/service: United States Army
- Battles/wars: Second World War

Charles F. Armstrong (May 25, 1919 – March 9, 1965) was an American politician and lawyer in Illinois.

== Biography ==
Armstrong was born in Statesville, North Carolina. He was an African American. Armstrong went to Tuskegee University and John Marshall Law School. He served in the United States Military during World War II. Armstrong served as assistant state's attorney for Cook County, Illinois. He lived in Chicago, Illinois with his wife and family and was involved with the Democratic Party. Armstrong served in the Illinois House of Representatives from 1957 until his death in 1965. Armstrong died suddenly from a heart attack at his home in Chicago after suffering from influenza.
