= Charles F. Armstrong (Pennsylvania politician) =

American politician (1865–1934)

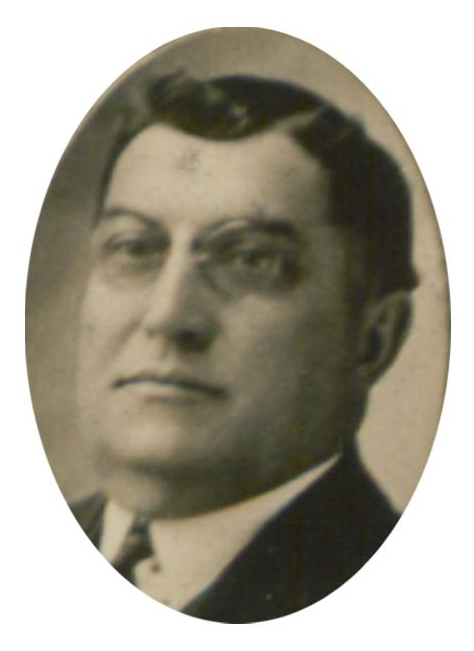

Charles Foster Armstrong (October 21, 1865 – February 4, 1934) was an American politician in the state of Pennsylvania. He served in the Pennsylvania House of Representatives from 1919 to 1929, representing Armstrong County. Along with State Senator Plymouth W. Snyder, he was one of the sponsors of the 1923 Snyder-Armstrong Prohibition Enforcement Act. He campaigned for the Lieutenant Governorship of Pennsylvania in 1930 but lost; he was later appointed Pennsylvania's Insurance Commissioner. He died on February 4, 1934, in Harrisburg; his wife and two sons survived him.
