= Gail Armstrong (illustrator) =

British illustrator

Gail Armstrong (born 1966) is a British illustrator using paper as a primary medium.

== Biography ==
Gail Armstrong was born in Sheffield in 1966 and where she completed a Foundation Course in art and design at Sheffield Polytechnic in 1984. Next, Armstrong went to Glasgow School of Art where she completed both a bachelor's of art in graphic design and illustration in 1987, and a master's degree in graphic design and illustration in 1988. She then moved to London where she still resides with her husband and two children.

Armstrong worked initially as a graphic designer for design consultancy The Small Back Room in London before leaving in 1990 to establish herself as a paper sculpture illustrator. Her three dimensional paper art is used in advertising, editorial, animation, design, children books and publishing. She has participated in several group exhibitions including at Bankside Gallery, the London Transport Museum and Somerset House. She is a member of the Association Of Illustrators. Her notable works include the Kleenex "Feelings" series, two gold lion and two bronze lions for the Cannes Lions International Festival of Creativity and the United Nations "Land" Philatelic Award and "[SOGO] Anniversary" World Illustration Award.

== Awards ==
Awards for Kleenex "Feelings" campaign with JWT, London include:

- Cannes International Advertising Festival 2010: Gold Lion award (billboards); Bronze Lion award (Illustration); Bronze Lion award (press)
- The Directory Big Won Creativity Rankings 2010 : 1st place Top 10 Press Campaigns in the World
- The London International Awards 2010 - Gold & Silver (print category)
- The 2010 International Andy Awards : Bronze (illustration)
- Creative Circle Awards 2011 : Silver Honour for Best Illustration (Craft Print category); Bronze Honour for Best Magazine Campaign (Press category); Commendation for Best Magazine Advertisement for Yes/No and for Glory/Failure
- WPP Award 2010 Gold for advertising (print)

Other awards include:

- Shortlisted World Illustration Awards 2015 (Advertising category) for "SOGO Anniversary"
- Shortlisted in AOI World Illustration Award 2014 (Research and Knowledge category) for "Life Cycle of a Butterfly"
- Asiago International Award for Philatelic Art 2012 (winner) for “Land” stamp in set of 3 for United Nations Conference on Sustainable Development in Rio
- Winner of Creativematch’s Flair Awards for Illustration Competition March 2011 for “Tufted Puffin”
- Winner of the Daler Rowney Award for Outstanding Paper Sculpture 1997

== Interviews, magazines and publications ==
Armstrong and her work have been showcased in the books

- “Paradise of Paper Art 2: World of Dance Paper” (p242-279) published by Designer Books, China
- “Understanding Illustration” by Derek Brazell and Jo Davies, published by Bloomsbury
- "Twitter Is Not a Strategy" (119-122) by Tom Doctoroff, published by Macmillan
- "Illustration" (p187) by Alan Male, published by Bloomsbury

Her work has been included in several magazine articles including

- "The Illustrator's Journal" Summer 2018 pages 31–37
- Varoom! Magazine Issue 26 - the STYLE issue, Summer 2014
- "Computer Arts" Magazine March 17, 2010
- "Design Week" April 2009
