= Charles L. Armstrong =

US Marine Corps lieutenant colonel

Lieutenant Colonel Charles L. Armstrong
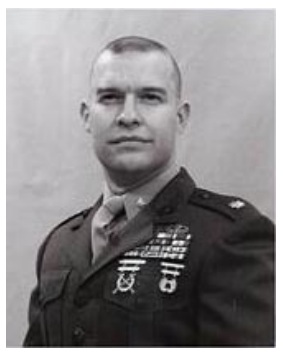
- Charles L. Armstrong
- Nickname: "Chuck"
- Born: Charles Lewis Armstrong
- Died: August 14, 2011 (aged 62–63) Trophy Club, Texas, U.S.
- Allegiance: United States
- Branch: United States Marine Corps
- Service years: 1970–1991
- Rank: Lieutenant colonel
- Awards: Defense Superior Service Medal; Navy and Marine Corps Medal; Purple Heart
- Other work: Author, fitness enthusiast

Charles Lewis Armstrong (c. 1948 – August 14, 2011) was a United States Marine Corps lieutenant colonel. During his 21-year career as a Marine, he participated in military actions in 22 foreign countries. Armstrong is known for his contributions to physical fitness and the many articles he wrote professionally.

== Military career ==
Choosing to remain in the Marine Corps until 1991, Armstrong's career involved him in four shooting wars across 22 foreign countries. He held the posts of Marine officer instructor (MOI) at UT, head of Regular Marine Officer Procurement, U.S. Naval Attaché in El Salvador, G3 of Marine Forces Central Command in Riyadh, as well as others. Charles received over 40 decorations, medals, and citations, including the Defense Superior Service Medal, Navy and Marine Corps Medal, and Purple Heart.

== Business and authorship ==
Following his retirement from the Marine Corps, LtCol Armstrong completed the executive MBA program at Southern Methodist University’s Cox School of Business and went on to work in various executive positions in companies ranging from start-ups to “Fortune 500” before making three returns to combat zones as a civilian. These included Egypt, Lebanon, and, finally, the Anbar Province of Iraq. Throughout this period, he wrote dozens of articles published in books, periodicals, and professional journals, such as The Marine Corps Gazette, one of which won the Wilcox Award for professional writing. In later years he enjoyed mentoring several military, retiring military, and graduating MBAs.

== Fitness legacy ==
In addition to competing in numerous karate tournaments, Armstrong, a lifelong fitness enthusiast, ran marathons and on two occasions set the world record for the most pull-ups completed in a single session, performing 1,435 repetitions in under five hours during his second attempt. He was a certified parachutist and scuba diver, and an avid weight lifter.

Armstrong contributed a well-respected exercise regimen known as the "Armstrong Pullup Program" which he used to get his trainees into shape for passing the USMC PFT and to get himself ready for attempts on the pull-ups completed in a single session world record. His seven-day regimen has varied tasks for five days with two consecutive rest days. Many officer training organizations keep the text of his program on hand and available online.

== Published works ==
- Armstrong, Charles L. (June 1999). "Marine Corps Gazette". Commentary on Business Reform.

== Sources ==
- "NROTC Alumni Log". September 2011.
