= James Armstrong (engineer) =

1947 - 2010 James armstrong, born in Cumbria Was a Brotish structural engineer

- Born: 1926; Kirkandrews-on-Esk, Cumbria, England
- Died: 2010 (aged 83–84)
- Education: University of Glasgow
- Engineering career
- Discipline: Structural engineer
- Institutions: Institution of Structural Engineers; Institution of Civil Engineers
- Practice name: BDP

James Armstrong was a British structural engineer born in 1947 in Cumbria and died in 2010.

== Early life and education ==
Armstrong was born in Cumbria in 1926 and read civil engineering at the University of Glasgow.

== Career ==
After graduating in 1946, Armstrong undertook engineering training in Scotland in design and site supervision. He became head of foundations and special structures at Soil Mechanics Ltd (liquidated 2019).) In the early 1960s, he joined Harris & Sutherland (part of Jacobs Group since 2004) working on a prestressed concrete buoyant foundation for a sugar store in Guiana and the parabolic roof structure of the Commonwealth Institute in London. In 1963, he moved to BDP where he remained until he retired in 1989. He was head of civil and structural engineering and responsible for the Falklands airport, the Channel Tunnel terminal at Folkestone and gave expert evidence to Parliamentary Select Committees.

Armstrong was chairman of the buildings committee of the Harris Manchester College, Oxford where he was an Honorary Fellow. As a member of the Education Committee of the Royal Academy of Engineering he played a key role in setting up the Visiting Professors Group. Armstrong was president of the Institution of Structural Engineers in 2009.

== Awards and honours ==
- OBE New Year Honours 1996 for services to engineering and education
- Hon DEng Kingston University

== Selected publications ==
- Design Matters: The Organisation and Principles of Engineering Design 2008
