= Bill Armstrong (photographer) =

American photographer

- Born: Concord, Massachusetts
- Occupation: Fine art photographer

Bill Armstrong is a fine art photographer known for his blurred color photographs.

== Life and career ==
Bill Armstrong is a fine art photographer. His Mandala series was featured in a two-person exhibition at the Philadelphia Museum of Art in 2008, and he had a retrospective at the Southeast Museum of Photography in Daytona Beach in 2010. Armstrong’s work is in many museum collections. He has presented work in numerous museum exhibitions including: the Smithsonian Institution; Hayward Gallery, London; Musee de l’Elysee, Lausanne; Centro Internazionale di Fotografia, Milan; and FOAM, Amsterdam. One of Armstrong’s images was chosen for the cover of Lyle Rexer’s Aperture book, The Edge of Vision: The Rise of Abstraction in Photography. His work appears in Face: The New Photographic Portrait by William Ewing and Exploring Color Photography by Robert Hirsch. He has been published in numerous periodicals including The New Yorker
