= Gary Armstrong (footballer) =

English footballer

Personal information
- Full name: Gary Stephen Armstrong
- Date of birth: 2 January 1958 (age 68)
- Place of birth: West Ham, England
- Position: Defender

Youth career
- 1975–1976: Gillingham

Senior career*
Years	Team	Apps	(Gls)
1976–1980	Gillingham	86	(2)
1980–1982	Wimbledon	71	(0)
1981	Gravesend & Northfleet (loan)	6	(0)
	Kemin Palloseura	120	(18)
	Barnet	7	(1)
1983–1984	Gillingham	8	(0)
1984–?	Crewe Alexandra	31	(1)
- Heybridge Swifts
- Haringey Borough
- Heybridge Swifts
- Hornchurch
- Harlow Town
- * Club domestic league appearances and goals

Gary Stephen Armstrong (born 2 January 1958) is an English former professional footballer. His clubs included Wimbledon, Crewe Alexandra and Gillingham.

== Honours ==
Wimbledon

- Football League Group Cup runner-up: 1981–82
