= Helen Maitland Armstrong =

American stained glass artist (1869–1948)

- Born: October 14, 1869; Florence, Italy
- Died: November 26, 1948 (aged 79)
- Occupation: Stained glass artist
- Parent: Maitland Armstrong

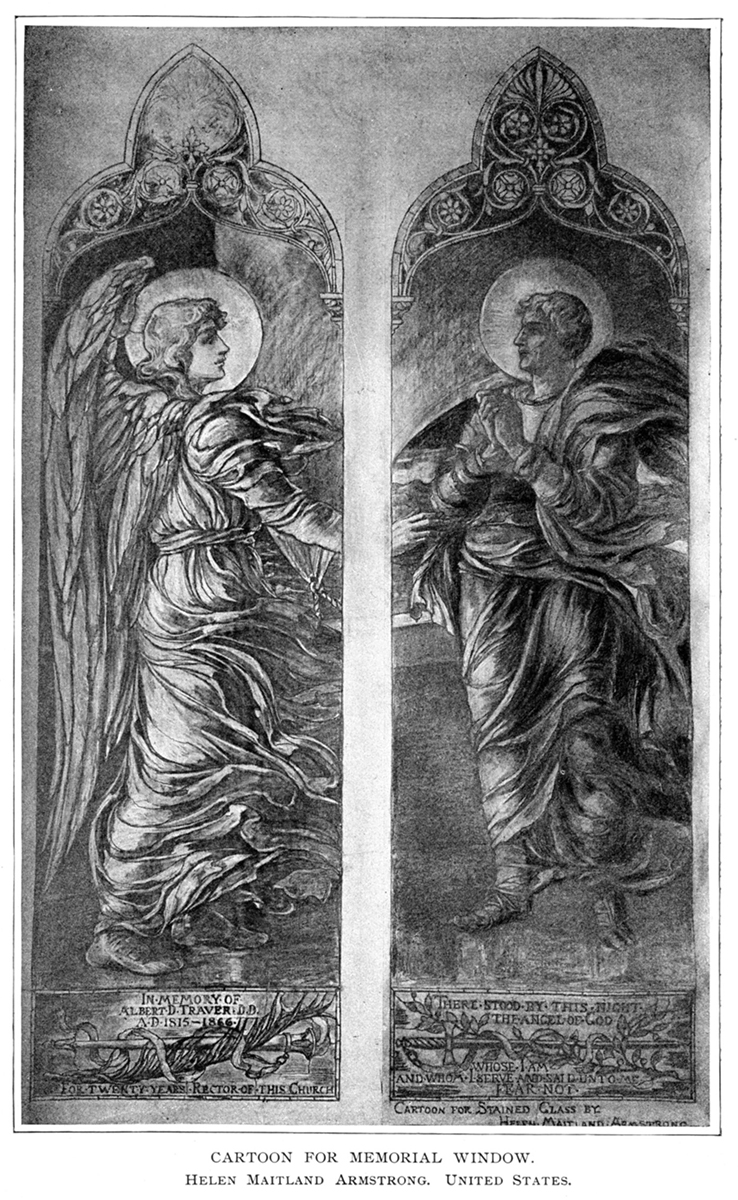
Helen Maitland Armstrong, cartoon for a memorial window shown at the 1893 World's Columbian Exhibition.

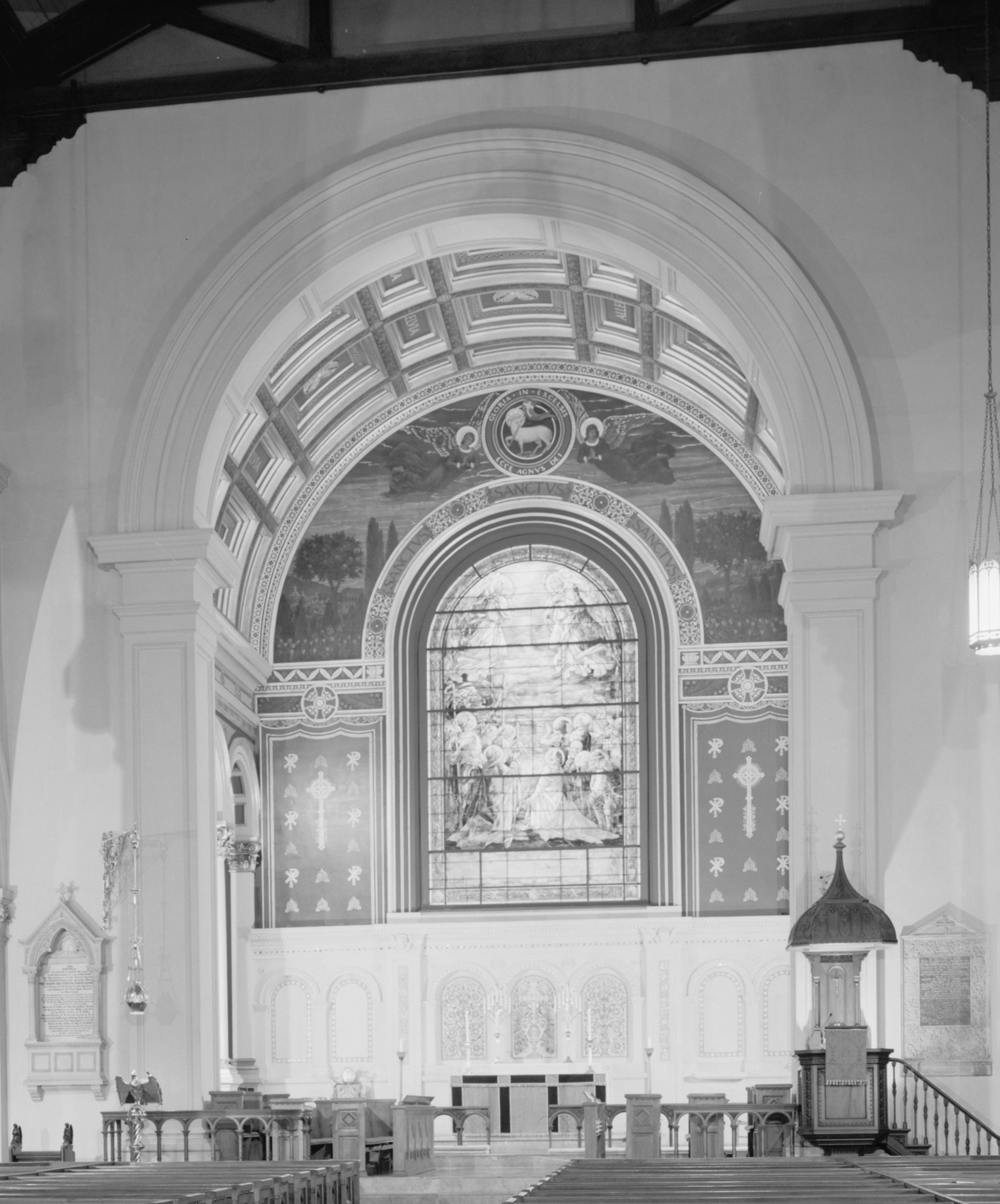
East window of Old St. Paul's Episcopal Church, Baltimore, Maryland, by Helen Maitland Armstrong, above reredos by Louis Comfort Tiffany, photographed after 1933. The window depicts the glorification of God and was installed ca. 1904.

Helen Maitland Armstrong (October 14, 1869 – November 26, 1948) was an American stained glass artist who worked both solo and in partnership with her father, Maitland Armstrong. Her work is considered among the finest produced in America in the late 19th and early 20th centuries.

== Early life ==
Helen Maitland Armstrong was born in 1869 in Florence, Italy, to American diplomat and stained glass artist Maitland Armstrong and his wife Helen, who was a descendant of Peter Stuyvesant and a niece of the politician Hamilton Fish. Her six siblings included book designer and author Margaret Neilson Armstrong and magazine editor Hamilton Fish Armstrong. In 1878, the sculptor Augustus Saint-Gaudens, who was a friend of her father's, created a bronze portrait plaque of her from a photograph.

She studied at the Art Students League of New York but received much of her artistic training from her father, who made her a junior partner in his firm of Maitland Armstrong & Co.

== Career ==
Armstrong's oeuvre centers on stained glass windows for churches but also includes mosaics, murals, and illustrations. The stained glass she created both solo and in business partnership with her father until his death in 1918 is considered among the finest in late 19th and early 20th century America, ranking alongside the work of Louis Comfort Tiffany and John La Farge, both of whom were friends of Armstrong and her father. She is a member of the first generation of women artists to take advantage of the new stained glass techniques pioneered by La Farge and Tiffany, along with Lydia Field Emmet and her sister Rosina Emmet Sherwood. Her earliest work dates from the 1890s; in 1893, a cartoon for one of her stained glass windows was shown in the Women's Building at the World's Columbian Exposition in Chicago.

Armstrong and her father together created drawings for stained glass windows—many of them memorials—for the First Congregational Church (St. Louis, Missouri), Christ's Church (Rye, New York), Jekyl Island Chapel (Brunswick, Georgia), First Presbyterian Church (Newburgh, New York), All Souls' Episcopal Church (Biltmore, North Carolina), Earl Memorial Chapel (Troy, New York), and Vassar College.

Armstrong's solo work—which the New York Times termed "exceptional"—included stained glass window designs for dozens of churches and chapels, as well as a government building and several private residences. She designed 16 windows using a 15th-century painted-glass technique for a private mausoleum for Alva Belmont in Woodlawn Cemetery. One of her windows for St. Andrew's Dune Church in Southampton, New York, was blown out by the Great New England Hurricane of 1938 and found intact afterwards half a mile away.

Armstrong's masterpiece may be the east window at Old St. Paul's Episcopal Church in Baltimore, Maryland, created as part of a general renovation of the church in 1904. Depicting the glorification of God, it is the focal point of the interior. Above it is a mural showing the Lamb of God, and beneath it is a stone reredos by Tiffany with other Christian symbols such as the peacock (symbolizing resurrection).

Armstrong also illustrated a number of books for the publisher A.C. McClurg. Amstrong and her sister Margaret illustrated several books together, including Max Müller's 1906 Memories: A Story of German Love and a 1907 edition of Theodor Storm's Immensee.

Armstrong died in the house where she was raised at 58 W. 10th St. in New York City on November 26, 1948. She was interred in the cemetery at Christ Episcopal Church in Marlboro, New York.

The Metropolitan Museum in New York holds a collection of her drawings and watercolors for stained glass windows as well as designs for an altarpiece and a mural.

== Selected solo commissions ==
- Christ's Church (Marlborough, New York)
- Church of Our Lady of Perpetual Help (Bernardsville, New Jersey)
- City Hall (Paterson, New Jersey)
- Sailors’ Snug Harbor Chapel (Staten Island, New York)
- St. Andrew's Dune Church (Southampton, New York)
- St. John's Church (Williamstown, Massachusetts)
- St. Paul's Episcopal Church (Baltimore, Maryland)
- Trinity Church (Newport, Rhode Island)
- Unitarian Church (Washington, DC)
