= Luis Moises Gomez =

Sephardic Jewish merchant in colonial New York (c. 1660–1740)

Luis Moses Gomez
- Born: c. 1660
- Died: 1740; New York City, Province of New York
- Occupations: Merchant, fur trader
- Known for: Gomez Mill House; leader of Congregation Shearith Israel
- Spouse: Esther Marques (died 1718)
- Children: Jacob, Mordecai, Daniel, David, Isaac, Benjamin

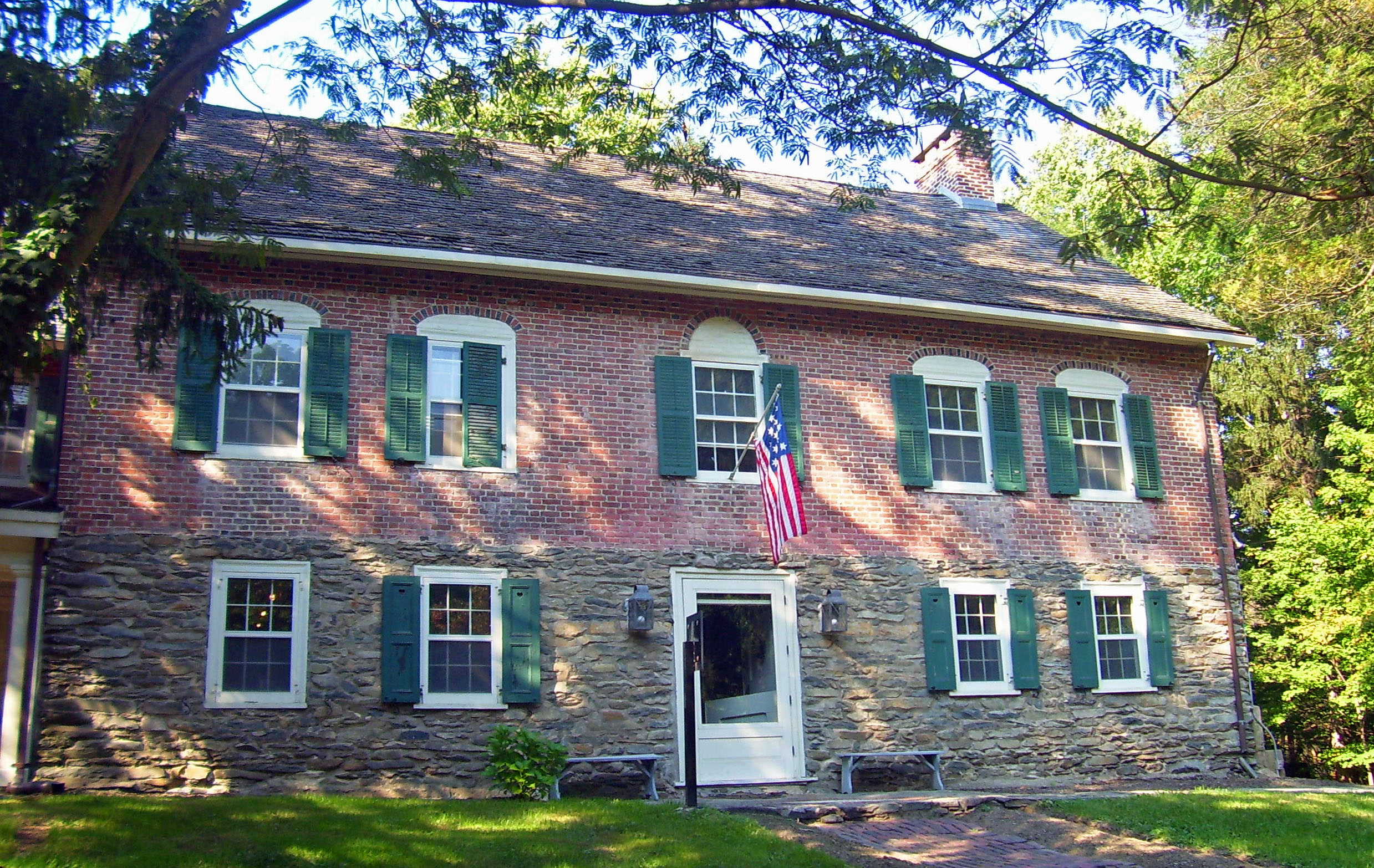
The Gomez Mill House in Marlboro, New York

Luis Moses Gomez (c. 1660 – 1740) was a Sephardic Jewish merchant and fur trader in colonial New York and the founder of the Gomez family, one of the most prominent Jewish mercantile families in North America. His house in the Hudson Valley, the Gomez Mill House, is the earliest known surviving Jewish residence in the United States. He was a leader of New York's Congregation Shearith Israel and helped bring about the building of its Mill Street Synagogue, the first purpose-built synagogue in North America.

== Early life ==
Gomez came from a family of Spanish Jews who had fled the Spanish Inquisition to France and England. His career took him across the Atlantic world; while living in Jamaica he married Esther Marques, and four of their sons were born in the West Indies.

== New York ==
Gomez settled in New York in 1703, though some sources date his arrival to 1696. In 1705 he received an act of denization from Queen Anne, giving him the right to trade, own property and live in the colony without swearing an oath of allegiance to the Church of England. He became one of the city's leading merchants, and in 1711 he was among the six Jewish merchants who contributed to the building of the steeple of Trinity Church.

== Gomez Mill House ==
In 1714 Gomez bought 6,900 acres (28 km^{2}) at what is now Marlboro, on the west bank of the Hudson River, where several Native American trails converged. There he built a single-story fieldstone blockhouse, from which he and his sons ran a profitable fur trading post for some thirty years. He also quarried limestone and milled timber for New York City, about 60 miles (97 km) to the south. The house, now known as the Gomez Mill House, is the earliest known surviving Jewish residence in the United States and the oldest home in Orange County listed on the National Register of Historic Places.

== Congregation Shearith Israel ==
In 1729 Gomez bought land in lower Manhattan that became a cemetery of Congregation Shearith Israel, and at about the same time he was elected the congregation's parnas (president). He helped secure support from Sephardic communities in the Caribbean for the congregation's Mill Street Synagogue, completed in 1730, the first building in New York constructed as a synagogue.

== Family ==
Gomez and Esther Marques had six sons: Jacob, Mordecai, Daniel and David, born in the West Indies, and Isaac and Benjamin, born in New York. Esther died in 1718. The sons became prosperous merchants and leaders of Shearith Israel; for much of the 18th century the Gomez family effectively controlled the congregation, and seven of its members served as parnas between 1730 and the American Revolution. Gomez died in 1740.

== See also ==
- Gomez Mill House
- History of the Jews in Colonial America
