= Rob Bell (baseball) =

American baseball player (born 1977)

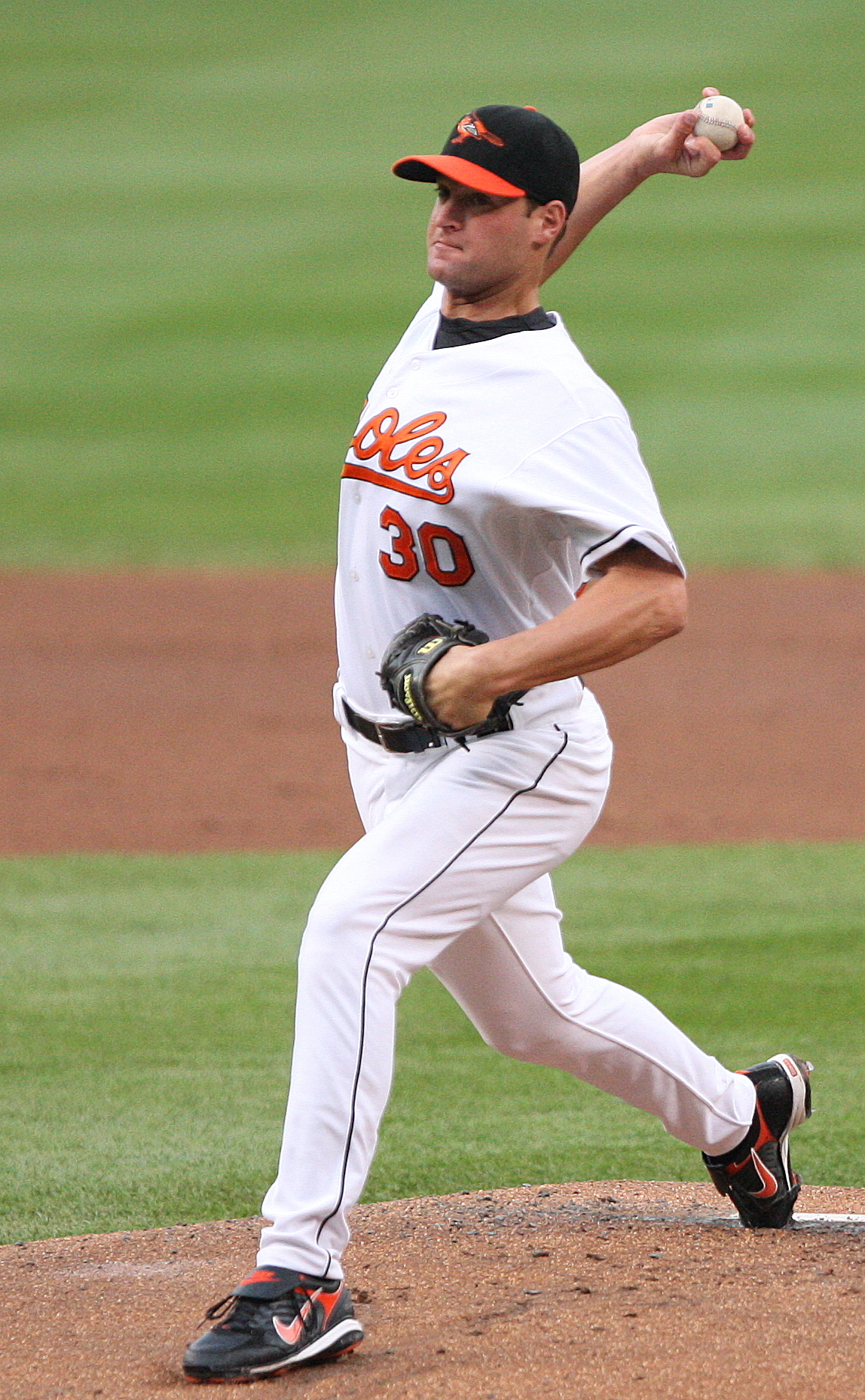
- Pitcher
- Born: January 17, 1977 (age 49); Newburgh, New York, U.S.
- Batted: Right Threw: Right

MLB debut
- April 8, 2000, for the Cincinnati Reds

Last MLB appearance
- September 30, 2007, for the Baltimore Orioles

MLB statistics
- Win–loss record: 34–37
- Earned run average: 5.71
- Strikeouts: 421
- Stats at Baseball Reference

Teams
- Cincinnati Reds (2000–2001); Texas Rangers (2001–2002); Tampa Bay Devil Rays (2003–2005); Baltimore Orioles (2007)

Robert Allen Bell (born January 17, 1977) is an American former professional baseball pitcher. He played in Major League Baseball (MLB) from 2000 to 2005, and a final season in 2007, with four different teams.

== Career ==
Bell attended Marlboro High School in Marlboro, New York, where he was teammates with Dee Brown. He initially committed to play college baseball at Wake Forest.

Drafted by the Atlanta Braves in the 3rd round of the 1995 Major League Baseball draft, Bell was considered a Braves top prospect and pitched in their minor league system until November 10, 1998, when he was traded with Denny Neagle and Michael Tucker to the Cincinnati Reds for Bret Boone and Mike Remlinger.

Bell made his major league debut with the Reds on April 8, 2000, against the Chicago Cubs. In Bell's first season in the Majors, he finished with an ERA of 5.00 in 26 starts. His record was 7–8 with 112 strikeouts and 73 walks. The following season, Bell started 9 games for Cincinnati before being sent down to AAA.

On June 15, 2001, Bell was traded to the Texas Rangers for Rubén Mateo and Edwin Encarnación. In 18 starts for the Rangers, Bell had a 5–5 record with a 7.18.

In 2002, Bell pitched in 17 games (15 starts) for the Rangers and split time with the Rangers and their AAA affiliate.

The Rangers released Bell on March 12, 2003. Five days later, Bell signed a minor league deal with the Tampa Bay Devil Rays. Bell began the season in the minors, pitching in 12 games before being called up to the majors. He went on to finish the season with 18 starts, striking out 44 batters in 101 innings. The Devil Rays resigned Bell following the 2003 season. In 2004, Bell had his best year and ended the season with a career high 8 wins. In 2005, Bell appeared in 8 games with the Devil Rays. In AAA, he only appeared in 22 games. He elected free agency afterwards, ending his 3-year tenure with Tampa Bay.

He signed with the Cleveland Indians on December 15, 2005, but Bell spent the entire 2006 season with the Indians' Triple-A affiliate, the Buffalo Bisons.

Bell signed a minor league deal with the Baltimore Orioles in 2006. Bell appeared in 30 games with the Orioles as a reliever, but was outrighted to the minors following the 2007 season, and elected free agency. In December 2007, he signed a minor league contract with the Washington Nationals, but was released during spring training. In April 2008, Bell signed a minor league contract with the Chicago White Sox, but was released in June.

On February 16, 2013, Bell joined the Tampa Bay Rays organization as a sales account representative for the Hudson Valley Renegades.
