= Marlboro High School (New York) =

Location
- 50 Cross Road; Marlboro, New York, 12542; 41°36′15″N 73°59′15″W

Information
- Type: Public high school
- Founded: 1967
- Principal: Ryan Lawler (The Law)
- Teaching staff: 55.39 FTEs
- Grades: 9-12
- Enrollment: 629 (as of 2023–2024)
- Student to teacher ratio: 11.36
- Colors: Orange and black
- Mascot: The Iron Duke
- Website: www.marlboroschools.org/o/mhs

Marlboro High School (MHS) is the Marlboro Central School District's high school located in Marlboro, New York, United States.

Marlboro High School is a comprehensive, four-year institution for students in Grades 9-12. It is accredited by the Middle States Association of Schools. The curriculum consists of honor courses, college preparatory and occupationally related programs. The school also has a cooperative college bridge program with Ulster County Community College in the areas of English, history, government, economics, science, psychology, sociology, mathematics, and Spanish.

As of the 2022-23 school year, the school had an enrollment of 628 students and 52.91 classroom teachers (on an FTE basis), for a student–teacher ratio of 11.87:1. There were 194 students (30.9% of enrollment) eligible for free lunch and 37 (5.9% of students) eligible for reduced-cost lunch.

The teachers of Marlboro Schools have been without a contract for over 140 days, which has caused 17% of teachers to resign from the district.

== Academics ==
Marlboro offers a curriculum that includes Advanced Placement classes, college bridge courses, and other course offerings. College bridge courses are offered through Ulster County Community College. In addition, there are online courses offered.

== Athletics ==
Marlboro competes in Section 9 of the New York State Public High School Athletic Association (NYSPHAA).

== Notable alumni ==
- Rob Bell, former MLB pitcher
- Brian Benben, actor
- Dee Brown, former MLB player
- Scott Lobdell, comic book writer
- Margaret Russo (1931-2006), shortstop who played from 1950 through 1954 in the All-American Girls Professional Baseball League
- Snooki, MTV television personality
- Brianna Titone, Colorado state representative
