= Dubois-Sarles Octagon =

- U.S. National Register of Historic Places
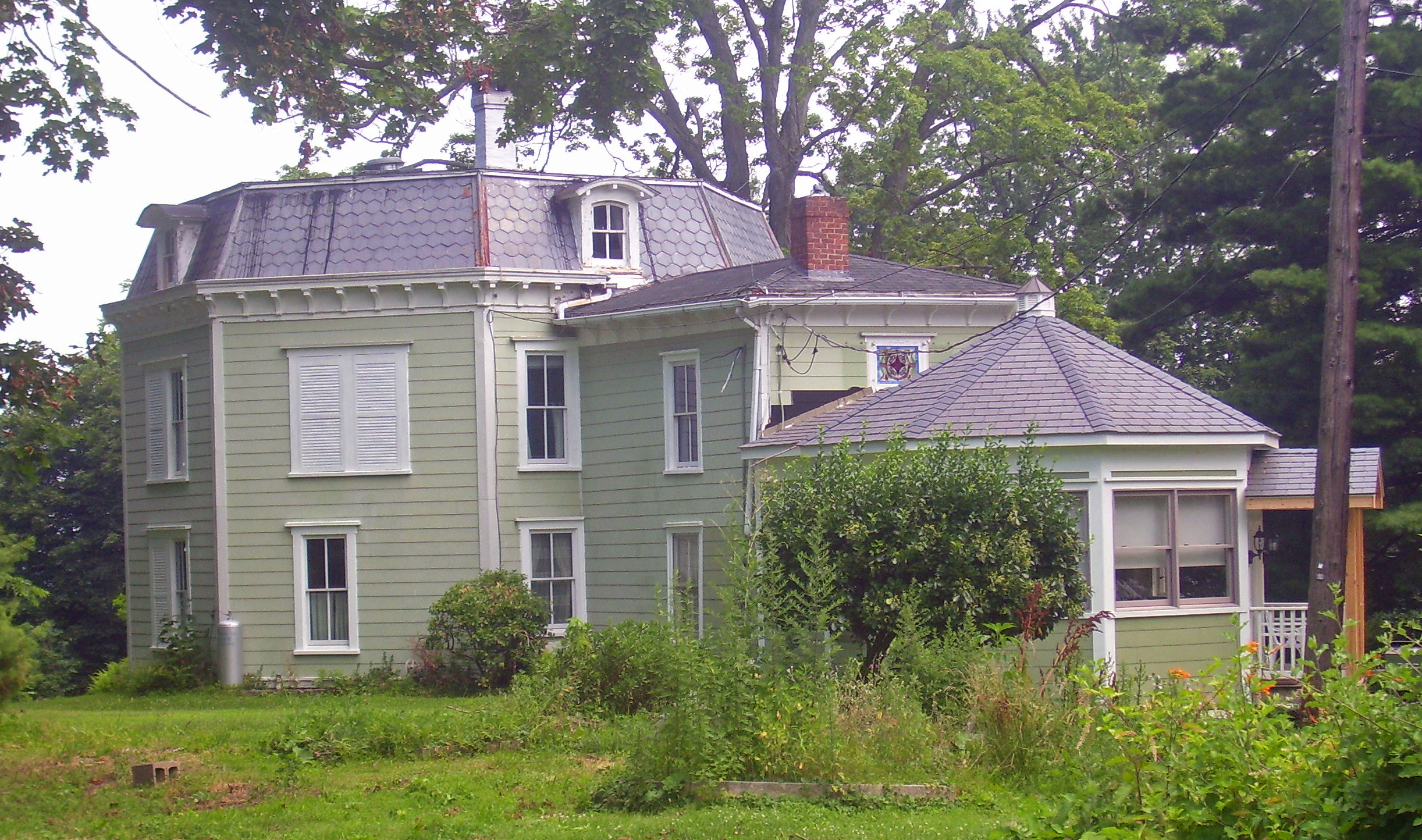
- West profile, 2008

- Location within New York Location within the United States
- Location: Marlboro, NY
- Coordinates: 41°36′2″N 73°58′27″W
- Built: 1850
- Architectural style: Octagon Mode, Greek Revival, Second Empire and Colonial Revival
- NRHP reference No.: 02001322
- Added to NRHP: November 15, 2002

External images
- South elevation showing main entrance
- Northeast facet showing new and old porch

The Dubois-Sarles Octagon is an octagon house located on South Street in Marlboro, New York, United States. It was listed on the National Register of Historic Places in 2002. As of 2018 it was only one of 15 eight-sided houses left in New York State.

First built around 1850 by Hudson Dubois and his family, it was renovated in 1872 by Alton and Helen Sarles. As a result, it reflects two different architectural styles: Italianate and Second Empire. Unlike most other American octagon houses of the period, its interior follows a sidehall plan, rather than the radial center plan advocated by Orson Squire Fowler.

== Building ==
The two-story house sits on a stone foundation. It is sided in asphalt, with overhanging bracketed eaves and a decorated frieze at the roofline. Above it is a mansard roof, covered in fish-scale slate shingles.

The main entry is located at the southeast facet of the house. Unusually for an octagon house, it is recessed to create a porch, extending outside of the house, overlooking the Hudson River roughly a mile to the east. A two-story rectangular kitchen wing projects from the west facet, with a sympathetic contemporary octagonal hip-roofed porch wing attached to it. The remains of an earlier porch project from the east facet.

Inside, the house follows a sidehall plan not seen in most octagon houses. Instead of being located in the center, the stairs are off to the side, allowing the eastern side of the first floor to be used as a large parlor with a fireplace on the west wall. This is echoed upstairs, with the master bedroom occupying the large eastern space and the other bedrooms to the west. Most finishings and trim are original, many representing the Greek Revival era in American architecture, which was winding down around the time the house was built.

There is also a garage on the property, but it is of modern construction and not considered a contributing resource.

== History ==
The Dubois family bought the property where the house now sits in the mid-19th century. Shortly afterwards they began building the house. The original had no projections, and was a pure octagon in keeping with Fowler's theories, save for the sidehall interior and recessed entrance. In 1872 they sold it to the Sarleses, who renovated the house extensively, adding a mansard roof then popular from the Second Empire style, and the kitchen wing.

It remained in their descendants' ownership until the late 20th century. At some point during that time, the original small eastern porch was removed and a bay window put into the wall on that facet. A Colonial Revival porch was then built out from the entrance recess. Other than that, there have been no major changes to the house.

== See also ==
- List of octagon houses
- National Register of Historic Places listings in Ulster County, New York
