= Margaret Neilson Armstrong =

American book cover designer, illustrator, and author

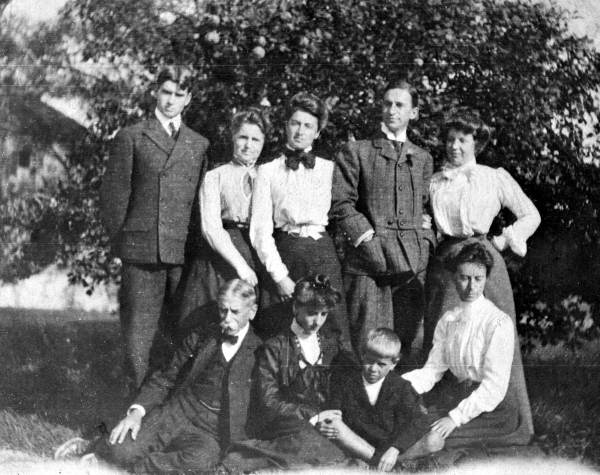
- The Armstrong family c. 1903. Front row, left to right: D. Maitland, Helen Maitland, Hamilton Fish, and Margaret Neilson. Standing, left to right: Noel, Helena, Marion, Edward Maitland, Maud Gwendolyn King (Edward's wife).
- Born: September 24, 1867; New York City, US
- Died: July 18, 1944 (aged 76); New York City, US
- Occupations: Author; Illustrator; Book cover designer
- Years active: 1887–1941
- Known for: American trade binding designs

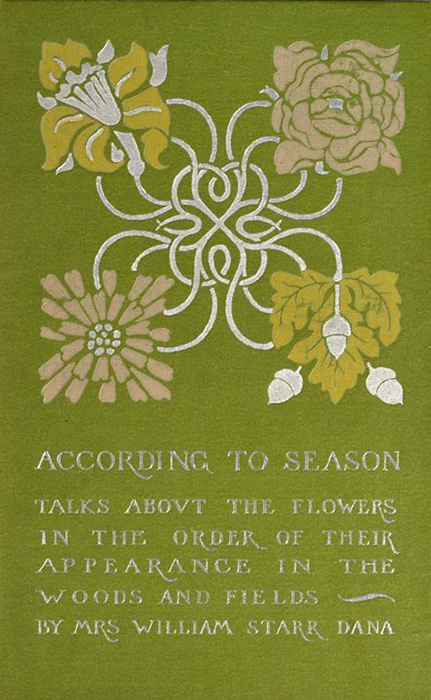
Cover of Mrs. William Starr Dana's 1894 book According to Season, designed by Margaret Neilson Armstrong.

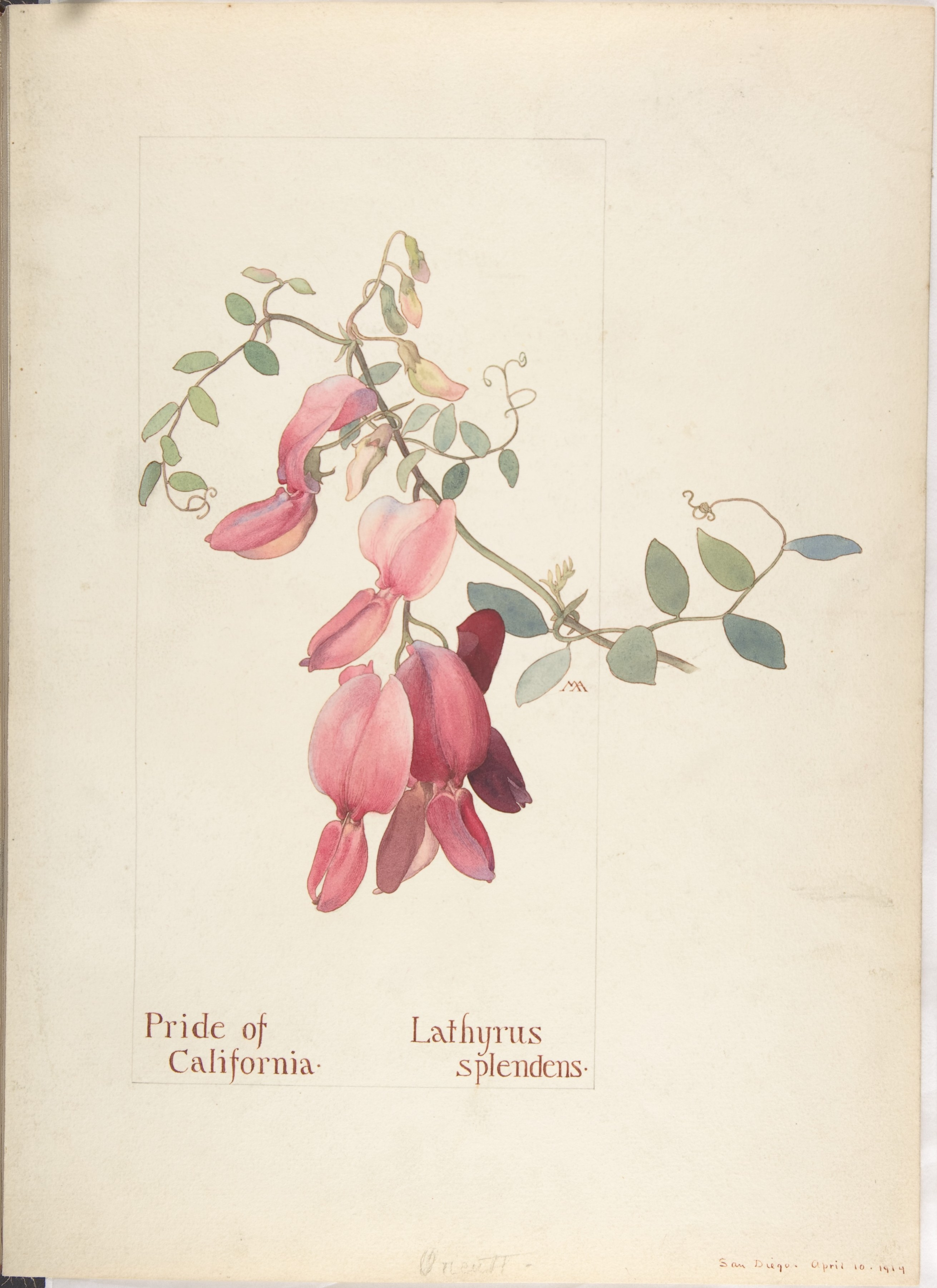
Pride of California, Lathyrus Splendens, 1914. Watercolor, original of one of the illustrations in Armstrong's Field Book of Western Wild Flowers. Collection of the Metropolitan Museum of Art

Margaret Neilson Armstrong (1867–1944) was a 19th and early 20th-century American book cover designer, illustrator, and author. She is best known for her book covers influenced by Art Nouveau. She also wrote and illustrated the first comprehensive guide to wildflowers of the American west, Field Book of Western Wild Flowers (1915). In later life, she wrote two popular biographies and three mystery novels.

== Life ==
Margaret Neilson Armstrong was born on September 24, 1867, in New York City, the daughter of American diplomat and stained glass artist Maitland Armstrong and his wife Helen, who was a descendant of Peter Stuyvesant and a niece of Hamilton Fish. Her six siblings included Helen Maitland Armstrong (1869–1948), who followed in her father's footsteps to become a stained glass artist, and Hamilton Fish Armstrong, long-time editor of Foreign Affairs magazine.

She began her career as a book cover designer in the late 1880s, initially doing commissions for Charles Scribner's Sons and A.C. McClurg and later for other publishers as well. She designed more than 314 book covers and book bindings, about half of which were for Scribner's. Her later work was influenced by Art Nouveau and favored plant-related motifs, bold colors, gold stamping, and often slightly asymmetrical designs in compositions that often seemed to be moving while standing still. Authors for whom she designed several covers include Frances Hodgson Burnett, Florence L. Barclay, George Washington Cable, Charles Dickens, Paul Laurence Dunbar, Robert Louis Stevenson, Henry van Dyke, and Myrtle Reed. She has been called "the most productive and accomplished American book designer of the 1890s and early 1900s", and her work is sometimes compared to that of her contemporary Alice Cordelia Morse.

Beginning in 1895, she began to leave her monogram on most of her covers; it is a simple 'MA' in upper case with the 'M' slightly overlapping the 'A'. Armstrong's designs were so successful that publishers sometimes hired artists specifically to imitate her look. Armstrong cut back on book cover design around 1913 as color-illustrated dust jackets began to come into fashion and turned to writing her own books.

Armstrong's passion for natural forms reflected her interest in botany and in particular, in wildflowers. During summers of the 1909-1914 period, she traveled and camped throughout the Western United States and Canada, becoming one of the first women to descend into the Grand Canyon. She discovered there several species of flowers that had not yet been identified by botanists. She describes those and many other species in her Field Book of Western Wild Flowers (1915). With its 550 illustrations (48 in color), her Field Book is considered the first comprehensive guide on the subject. After the completion of her Field Book, she moved on to editing her father and brother's works. In her sixties and seventies, she wrote three critically praised mystery novels—Murder in Stained Glass (1939), The Man with No Face (1940), and The Blue Santo Murder Mystery (1941)—and two biographies, Fanny Kemble: A Passionate Victorian (1938) and Trelawny: A Man's Life (1940).

She died in New York City in 1944.

== Collections and exhibitions ==
Collections of her book covers include those at the Metropolitan Museum of Art, the Library of Congress, and West Virginia University Libraries. Armstrong's book cover art has been exhibited posthumously at the Metropolitan Museum of Art's Watson Library, West Virginia University Libraries and the New York Society Library. Her botanical work is represented in the Metropolitan Museum of Art's collections and the collections of the New York Botanical Garden.

== Books ==
- Field Book of Western Wild Flowers (1915)
- Five Generations (1930)
- Fanny Kemble: A Passionate Victorian (1938)
- Murder in Stained Glass (1939)
- Trelawny: A Man's Life (1940)
- The Man With No Face (1940)
- The Blue Santo Murder Mystery (1941)
Book cover designs by Margaret Neilson Armstrong
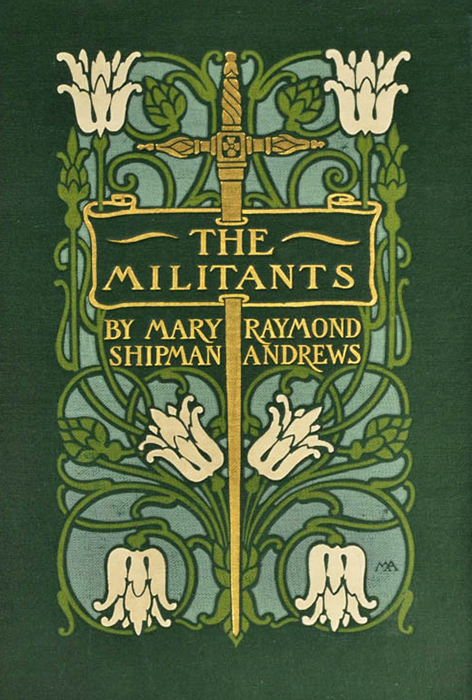
Mary Raymond Shipman Andrews, The Militants, 1907.

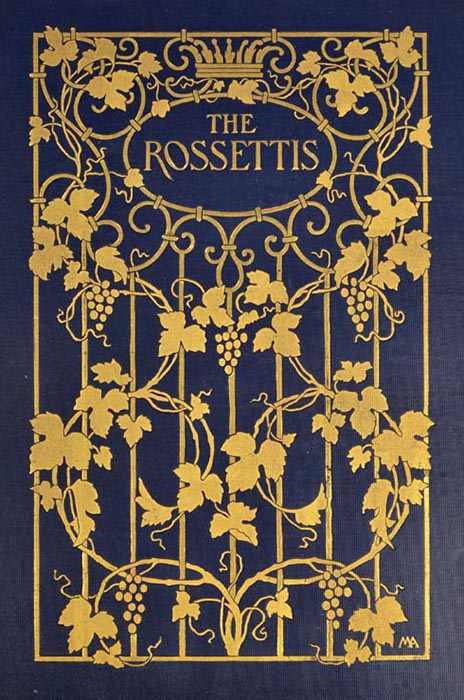
Elisabeth Luther Cary, The Rossettis, 1900.

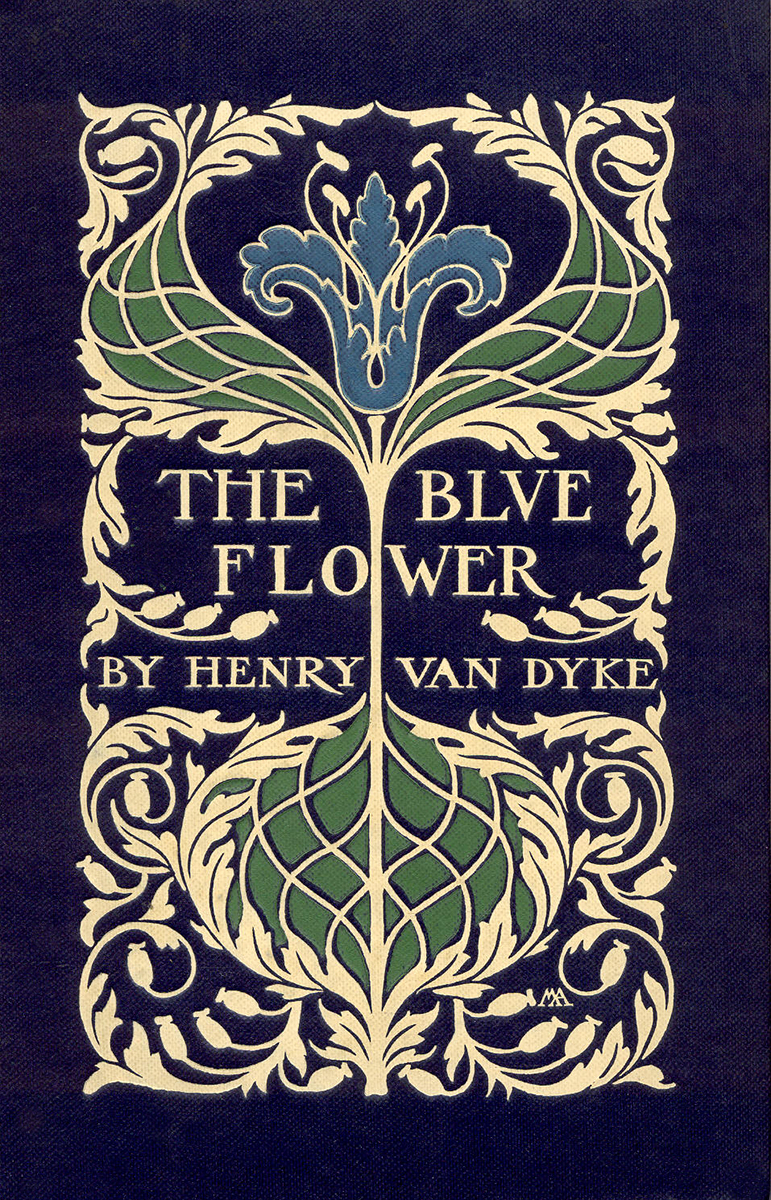
Henry van Dyke, The Blue Flower, 1902.
