= Christ Episcopal Church (Marlboro, New York) =

Historic church in New York, United States

- U.S. National Register of Historic Places
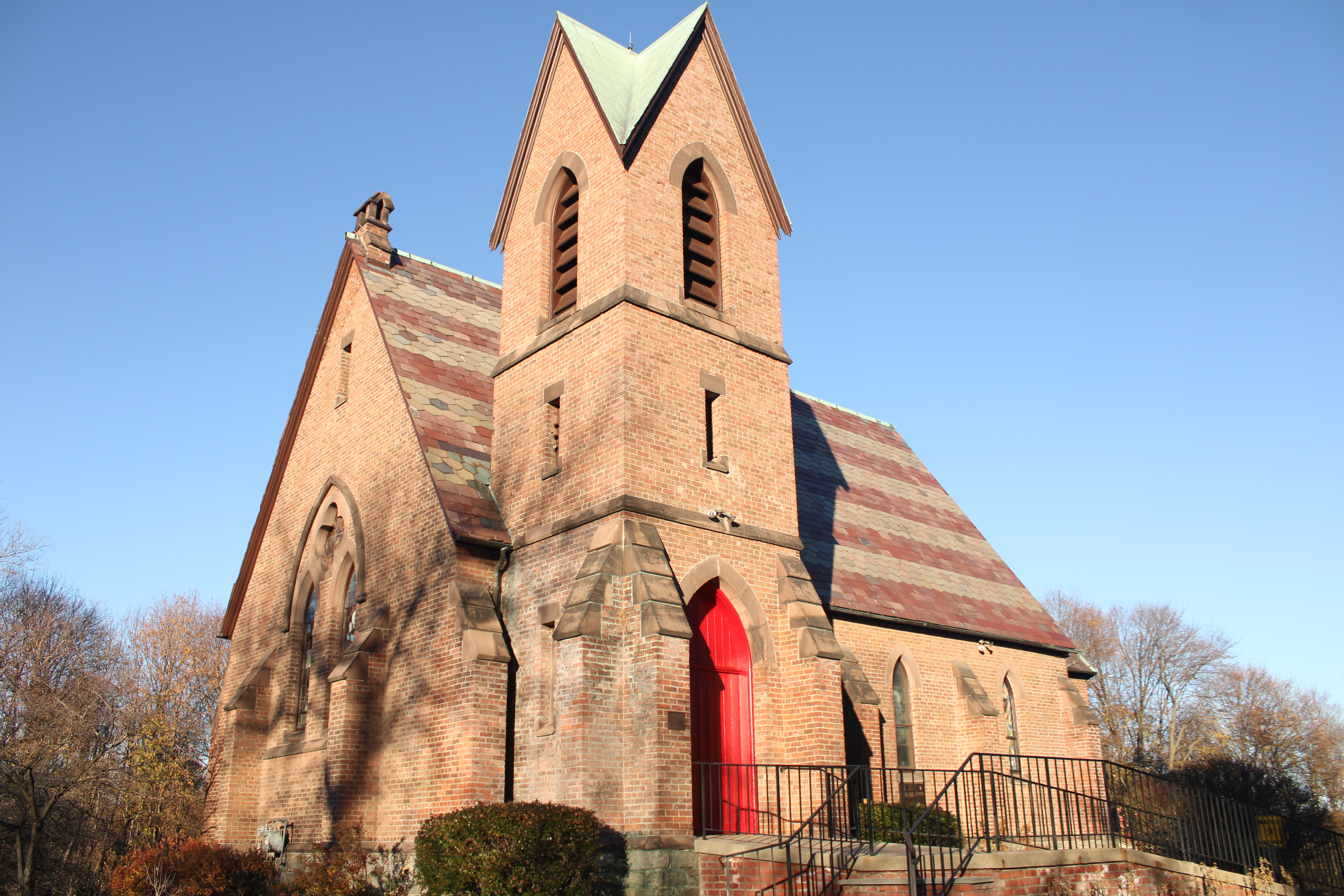

- Location within New York Location within the United States
- Location: 426 Old Post Road, Marlboro, New York
- Coordinates: 41°36′1″N 73°58′18″W
- Area: 2.95 acres (1.19 ha)
- Built: 1858
- Architect: Richard Upjohn
- Architectural style: Gothic Revival
- NRHP reference No.: 10000916
- Added to NRHP: November 10, 2010

Christ Episcopal Church is a historic Episcopal church located in Marlboro, Ulster County, New York. The church was designed by architect Richard Upjohn and built in 1858 in the Gothic Revival style. It is built of dark red brick with contrasting brownstone detailing. It features a square entry tower and polygonal apse with steeply pitched roofs, with polychrome slate shingles on the main section. It also has a notable collection of stained glass windows designed by D. Maitland Armstrong (1836–1918). Also on the property is the church rectory (1863) and cemetery, with burials dating before 1840.

It was listed on the National Register of Historic Places in 2010.
