= Chapel Hill Bible Church =

Historic church in New York, United States

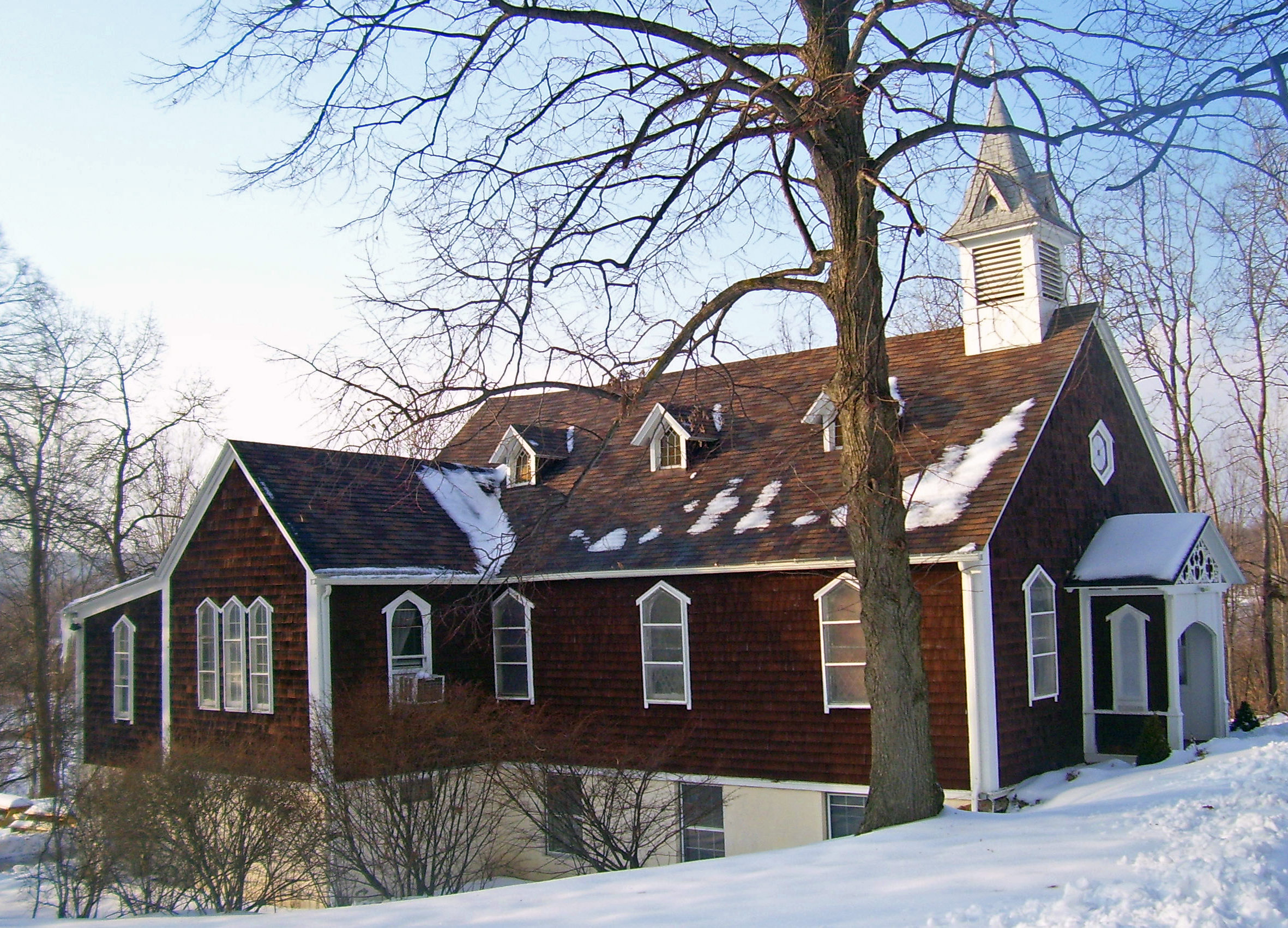
- South profile and east elevation, 2009

- Chapel Hill Bible Church is located in New York

Religion
- Affiliation: Non-denominational
- Leadership: Pastor Mike Hannigan
- Year consecrated: 1860

Location
- Location: Marlboro, NY, USA
- Coordinates: 41°35′11″N 73°59′40″W

Architecture
- Style: Picturesque

Specifications
- Direction of façade: east
- Materials: Wood, stone, concrete, asphalt, glass and brick

U.S. National Register of Historic Places
- Added to NRHP: January 7, 2005
- NRHP Reference no.: 04001450

Website
- Chapel Hill Bible Church

Chapel Hill Bible Church, formerly Amity Baptist Church, is a Baptist house of worship located off Bingham Road near Marlboro, New York, United States. It is a small wooden building in the Picturesque mode of the Gothic Revival architectural style dating to the mid-19th century. In 2005 it was listed on the National Register of Historic Places. It is the southernmost property on the Register in Ulster County.

It was originally built not on its present site but in what is now midtown Manhattan, for a congregation that had split off from another church downtown. In the early 20th century, after it had fallen into disuse, a prominent member of the original congregation who had moved up to Marlboro had the church disassembled and moved to property he owned on a hilltop overlooking the Hudson River. For two decades it was used for retreats by the Brotherhood of the Kingdom, a group of Social Gospel advocates. After another period of disuse later in the century, the current church was organized there in the 1970s.

== Buildings and grounds ==
The church property is a 12.5-acre (5.1 ha) parcel on the west side of an unpaved driveway off the south side of Bingham Road in the southern section of the Town of Marlborough, roughly a mile and a half (3 km) southwest of the town's major settlement, the unincorporated hamlet of Marlboro. It is just west of the top of a 500-foot (150 m) hill, and 200 feet (61 m) north of the Orange County line.

All the land in the vicinity of the church is rural, either cleared for use as apple orchards or left as intact woodlots. A farmhouse faces the church across the driveway. The church's lot is mostly wooded with a wedge-shaped cleared area to the northeast. In this portion a sand-surfaced volleyball court has been built along the driveway, with some playground equipment present in the warmer months. From the open areas panoramic views of the Hudson Valley to the east and the Shawangunk Ridge to the west are available. The driveway bends south through a parking area to the southeast of the church to a small square half-court with basketball hoop on the west. Another parking area is to the northeast. A small, non-contributing modern garage is located at the bend. From it a concrete walkway leads to the church entrance.

=== Exterior ===
The church itself is a cruciform wood frame one-and-a-half–story building on a foundation of concrete on the front and sides and mortared stone in the rear. The downward slope of the ground exposes the basement on the sides and rear, giving the effect of an additional story. It is sided in brown-stained cedar shingles and topped by a steep gabled asphalt roof pierced by three small gabled dormer windows on either side east of the gabled transept, with one shed-roofed three-window dormer set with diamond-pane colored glass on either side to the west. A short bell tower rises from the east (front) end.

On the east facade is the main entrance, flanked by pointed-arch tripane windows in wooden surrounds. A small projecting wooden vestibule shelters the main entrance. It has a gabled roof with the same pitch as the main roof. The gently arched exterior entrance is built of an H-shaped bent with beadboard siding on the exterior, chamfered edges on the inside and intricate quatrefoil sawn tracery in the gable field above. Lancet windows are on either side. Above it is an octagonal oculus.

The side elevations have three windows similar to those on the east between the front and the transept. Below them the basement have three six-over-six double-hung sash windows. The single bay extent of the transept has another pointed window on the east and west, with a tripartite grouping of windows on the south end. The north transept has a fire escape on its east and north end walls, around the single round-arched window on that end. A shed-roofed addition fills the corner on the south side between the transept and the apse. It has a pointed window on the south face.

The west facade has a basement entrance and tripartite window, again with diamond-paned colored glass, on the apse flanked by pointed windows on the pent-roofed sides, with another octagonal oculus in the rear gable field above where the apse projects. Below the apse the basement is mortared fieldstone. Windows, a main entrance and a secondary entrance on the south side are trabeated with brick.

=== Interior ===
The sanctuary is sparely furnished. Gently curved wooden pews with scroll armrests and recessed end panels flank the center aisle, leading to the altar. Its wooden flooring is now carpeted; the plaster walls have beaded wainscoting. Above, the wooden trusses with chamfered lower chords and collar ties that frame the roof are exposed. At the end of the aisle is the altar on a raised dais. On it is a wooden lectern with Greek Revival detailing.

Walls separate smaller rooms in the transept and apse. The former are small prayer rooms. In the north is a devotional stained glass window. Inside the entrance to the south room is an intricately carved wooden surround with religious motifs that supports the organ pipes.

In the basement are rooms of a support function. This include the kitchen, bathrooms, Sunday school room and fellowship hall. The 1902 boiler installed when the church was moved to the site is still located down there. Finishes are otherwise modern, with linoleum, plaster and faux-wood paneling walls and dropped ceilings.

== History ==
In the early 1830s, some members of the Oliver Street Baptist Church (now the Mariners' Temple) in Lower Manhattan split from that congregation. They rented a hall on Broadway in 1832 so that the young Rev. William R. Williams could conduct services. They made plans to build a church of their own.

Two years later they entered into a lease for some land on Amity Street. On that land they built the original 1834 Amity Street Baptist Church, a temple-style Greek Revival building with six Ionic columns along its front facade. Samuel Dunbar, the architect, is believed to have emulated his earlier design for the Thirteenth Street Presbyterian Church. Neither building is extant; the lectern in the current church, whose Greek Revival detailing suggests some of Minard LaFever's work, may be the only remnant of the original church.

Lower Manhattan's growth and transformation in the early industrial era was rapidly making it less desirable for churches, and many sold their original properties in that area, using the proceeds to buy and build further uptown. Amity Street sold its original property, which was converted to stables, and moved to new grounds on 54th Street. Since the name was no longer geographically relevant, the congregation became just Amity Baptist Church.

The current church building was probably built as a chapel or supplementary building on that property around 1860. Its Picturesque styling, enhanced even further by its original board-and-batten siding, was then a common mode for many American Protestant churches. Richard Upjohn, an Episcopalian immigrant from England, popularized the Gothic style for larger churches of his denomination. Baptists found more modestly scaled, restrained versions worked for them stylistically, and many variations were built.

In 1885 Williams died after a half-century of leading the church he had helped found. He left a final message to the congregation: "Pray and trust; love Him and serve Him, ardently and supremely. He will never forsake those who put their trust in him, never." It is written on a wooden plaque that remains in the church's possession.

Leighton Williams took over from his father. He bought the 200-acre (81 ha) Marlborough property for retreats from the city in 1893, holding annual meetings of the Brotherhood of the Kingdom, a group he had helped found along with Social Gospel proponent Walter Rauschenbusch, there starting that year, and coming there more often with his wife Nellie after their 1896 marriage. The congregation in New York declined and eventually sold the main church. The chapel remained, and in 1905 Williams had it disassembled and shipped to Ulster County, where it was rebuilt at the current location. He began holding services at what he called Amity Chapel of the Amity Baptist Church, and soon it had one of the largest Sunday schools in the area. A schedule of weekly services from this era is also among the memorabilia in the church.

In 1914 Williams sold the building and its accompanying land to the trustees of the church for $4,250 ($137,000 in contemporary dollars). The church modernized the building, adding the transepts on the outside and heating and electric lighting inside. In 1915 the Brotherhood held its last retreat there. At some point past 1919, the year a photograph of the church shows the original board-and-batten siding in place, the current shingled siding was added, most likely with the older siding as furring.

The trustees turned the church over to a newer group, the Amity Foundation, in 1927. It included the Williamses and other local Baptist pastors. By 1961 many of these founding members had died, the foundation had become inactive and the church was again neglected.

Members of Moulton Memorial Baptist Church in nearby Newburgh re-established the church and foundation in 1962. Services were held under the Rev. Edward Cuthbert for a few years, followed by another period of inactivity. Again in 1973, the foundation re-established the church, this time as the Chapel Hill Community Church. In 1987 it changed its name to the Chapel Hill Bible Church. At one point during the 1990s the congregation had declined to less than ten members, and inactivity threatened again, but it rebounded to the point that the church considered hiring an assistant pastor.

Currently the church holds Sunday school and services on Sunday mornings weekly, with a Wednesday evening Bible study group. Other ministries have been held on other weekday nights in the recent past. Missionaries sponsored by the church have served in Africa and Hungary.

== See also ==
- National Register of Historic Places listings in Ulster County, New York
