= Shady Brook Farm (Marlboro, New York) =

Historic house in New York, United States

- U.S. National Register of Historic Places
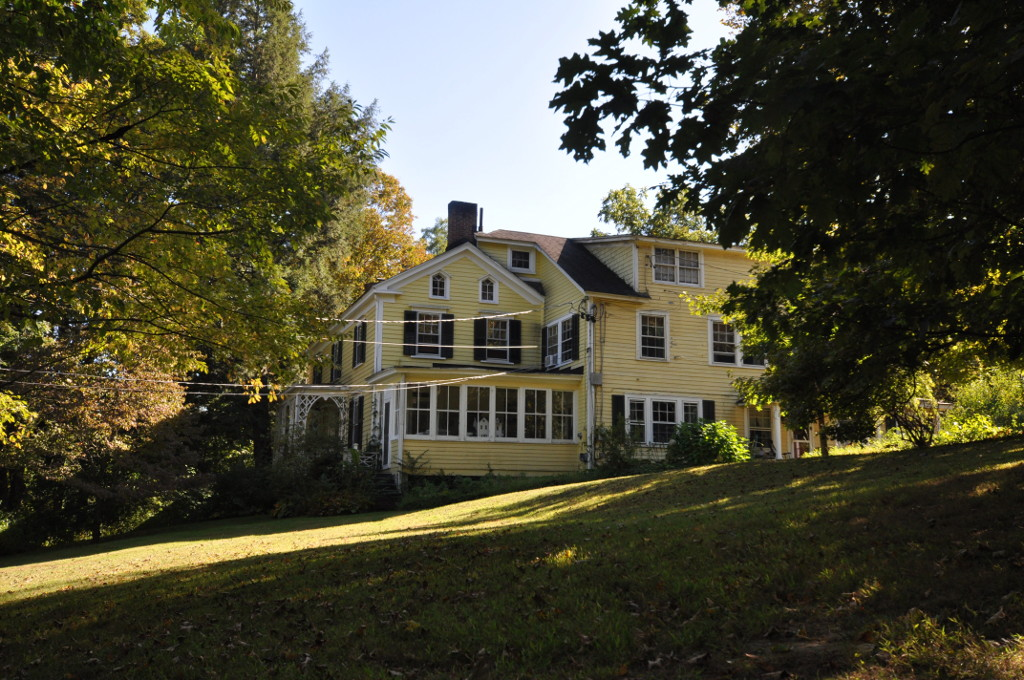

- Location within New York Location within the United States
- Location: 351 Old Post Road, Marlboro, New York
- Coordinates: 41°35′38″N 73°58′16″W
- Area: 9.43 acres (3.82 ha)
- Built: c. 1850, c. 1890, c. 1917
- Architect: Pembroke, Ali
- Architectural style: Greek Revival, Gothic Revival
- NRHP reference No.: 12000961
- Added to NRHP: November 21, 2012

Shady Brook Farm is a historic home located at Marlboro, Ulster County, New York. The house was originally built about 1850 in the Greek Revival style, and substantially enlarged and remodeled about 1917. It consists of two two-story, gable-roofed blocks. The front facade features a picturesque front porch with Gothic Revival style design elements. Also on the property are the contributing 2 1/2-story "South Cottage" (c. 1890) and a carriage barn (c. 1890). After 1917, the main house was used as a summer boarding house until 1954.

It was listed on the National Register of Historic Places in 2012.
