= Cathedral of All Souls (Asheville, North Carolina) =

Historic church in North Carolina, United States

- The Cathedral and Parish Church of All Souls
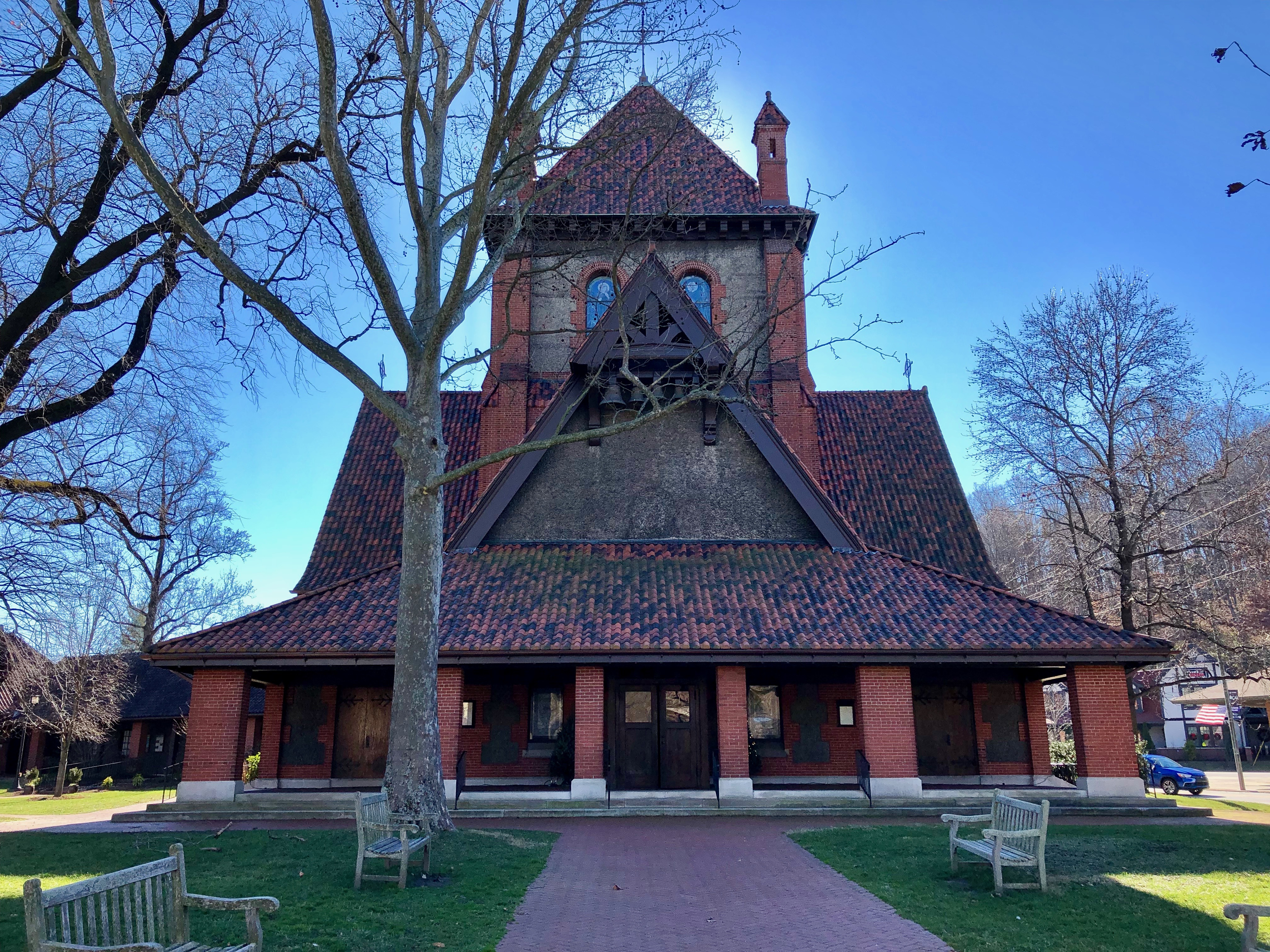
- Front view of the Cathedral

- Location within North Carolina
- 35°33′56.42″N 82°32′34.19″W
- Location: 2 Angle St., Biltmore Village; Asheville, North Carolina
- Country: United States
- Denomination: Episcopal Church
- Website: www.allsoulscathedral.org

History
- Founded: 1896
- Consecrated: November 8, 1896

Architecture
- Architect: Richard Morris Hunt
- Style: Romanesque Revival

Administration
- Diocese: Western North Carolina

Clergy
- Dean: Sarah Hurlbert
- All Souls Episcopal Church and Parish House
- U.S. National Register of Historic Places
- MPS: Biltmore Village MRA
- NRHP reference No.: 79001664
- Added to NRHP: November 15, 1979 Private

The Cathedral of All Souls, also referred to as All Souls Cathedral, is an Episcopal cathedral located in Asheville, North Carolina, United States of America. All Souls was built by George Washington Vanderbilt II, the grandson of railroad baron, Cornelius Vanderbilt, in 1896, to serve as the local parish church for Biltmore Village, which had been developed near his Biltmore Estate, and designated as a cathedral in 1995. The church reported 896 members in 2022 and 1,072 members in 2023; no membership statistics were reported in 2024 parochial reports. Plate and pledge income reported for the congregation in 2024 was $650,582 with average Sunday attendance (ASA) of 213 persons.

== History ==
The church was established in 1896 as a member of the Episcopal Diocese of Western North Carolina. It is a member of the worldwide Anglican Communion. The Church and Parish Hall were commissioned by George Vanderbilt and designed by Richard Morris Hunt, the architect of Vanderbilt's Biltmore Estate.

The chancel organ was installed by the Casavant Frères organ company of Canada in 1971. The Cathedral of All Souls was designated as the cathedral of the Episcopal Diocese of Western North Carolina on January 1, 1995. The Right Reverend José A. McLoughlin is the current bishop.

Stained glass artists Maitland Armstrong and Helen Maitland Armstrong created three memorial stained glass windows for the south transept, honoring Maria Louisa Vanderbilt (George W. Vanderbilt's mother), architect Richard Morris Hunt, and Clarence Barker (Vanderbilt's cousin). They later created "Ecce Homo," a stained glass memorial at All Souls' Church in Biltmore, for Cornelius Vanderbilt, in 1900.

The church and its parish house was added to the National Register of Historic Places in 1979 as All Souls Episcopal Church and Parish House.

In 2015 a major restoration project replaced the 119 year-old Ludowici roof tiles with new ones designed to match the originals.

In September 2024, the cathedral was damaged during Hurricane Helene when the Swannanoa River flooded Biltmore Village.

== Gallery ==
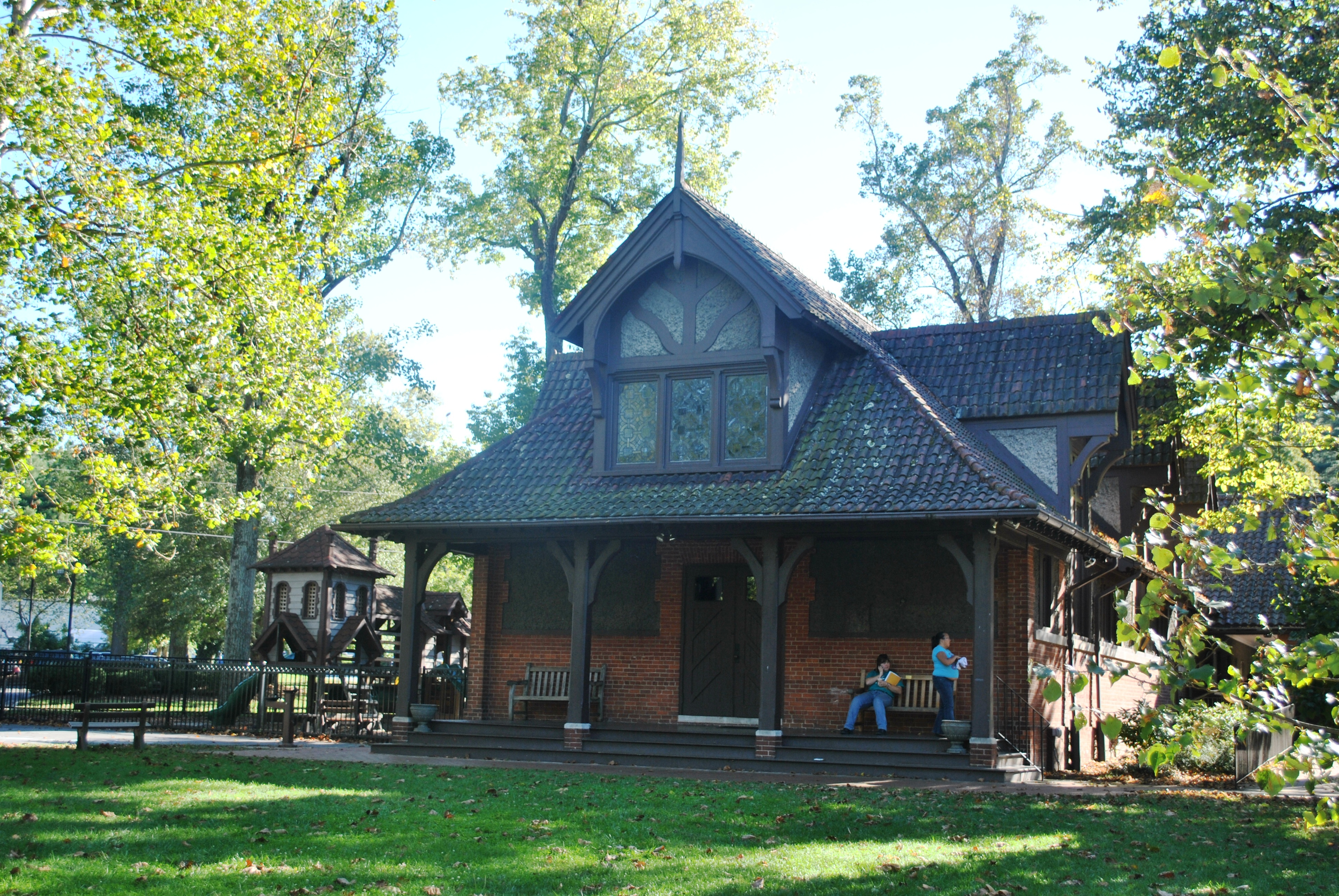
All Souls Episcopal Church and Parish House

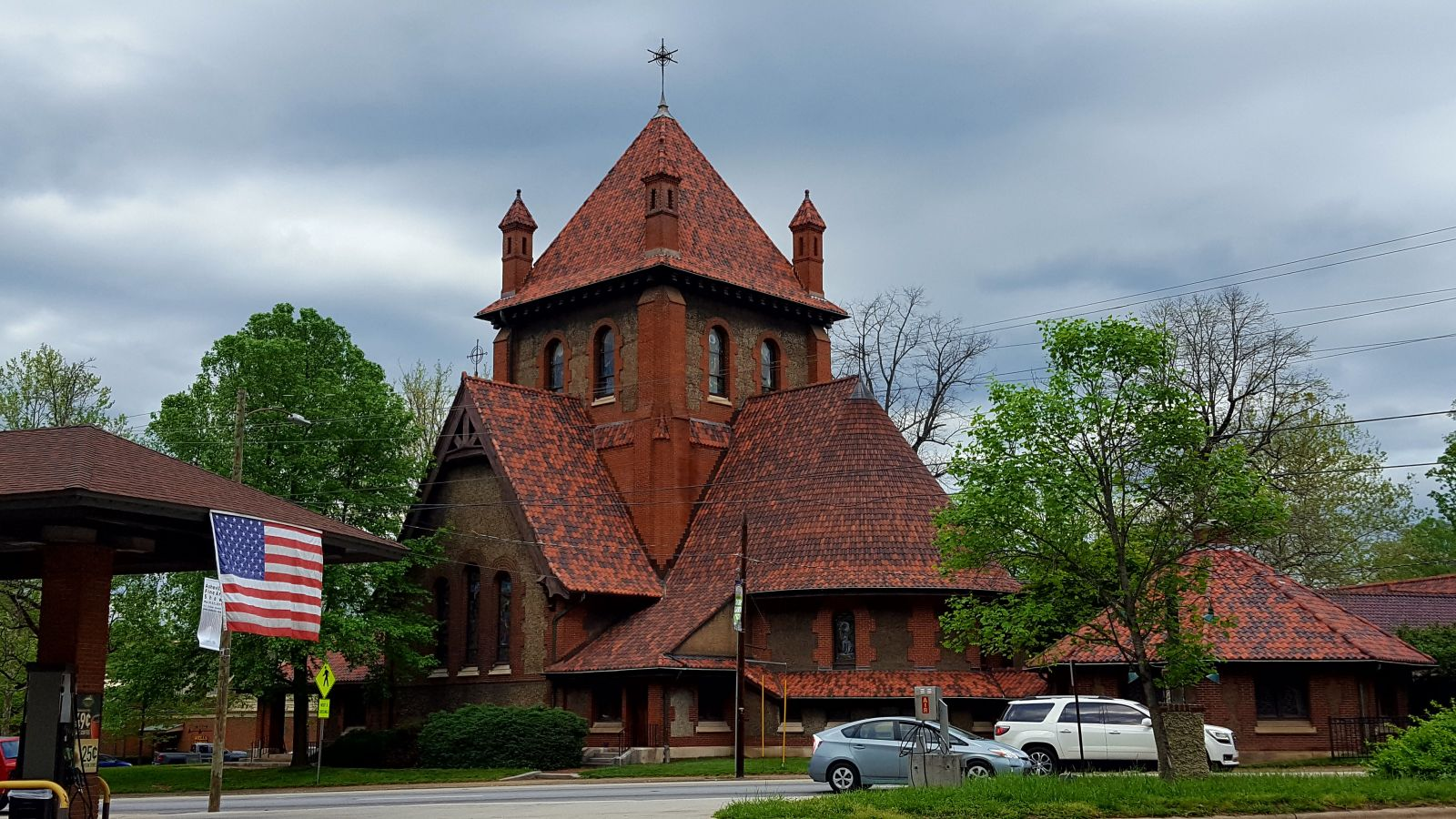
2017

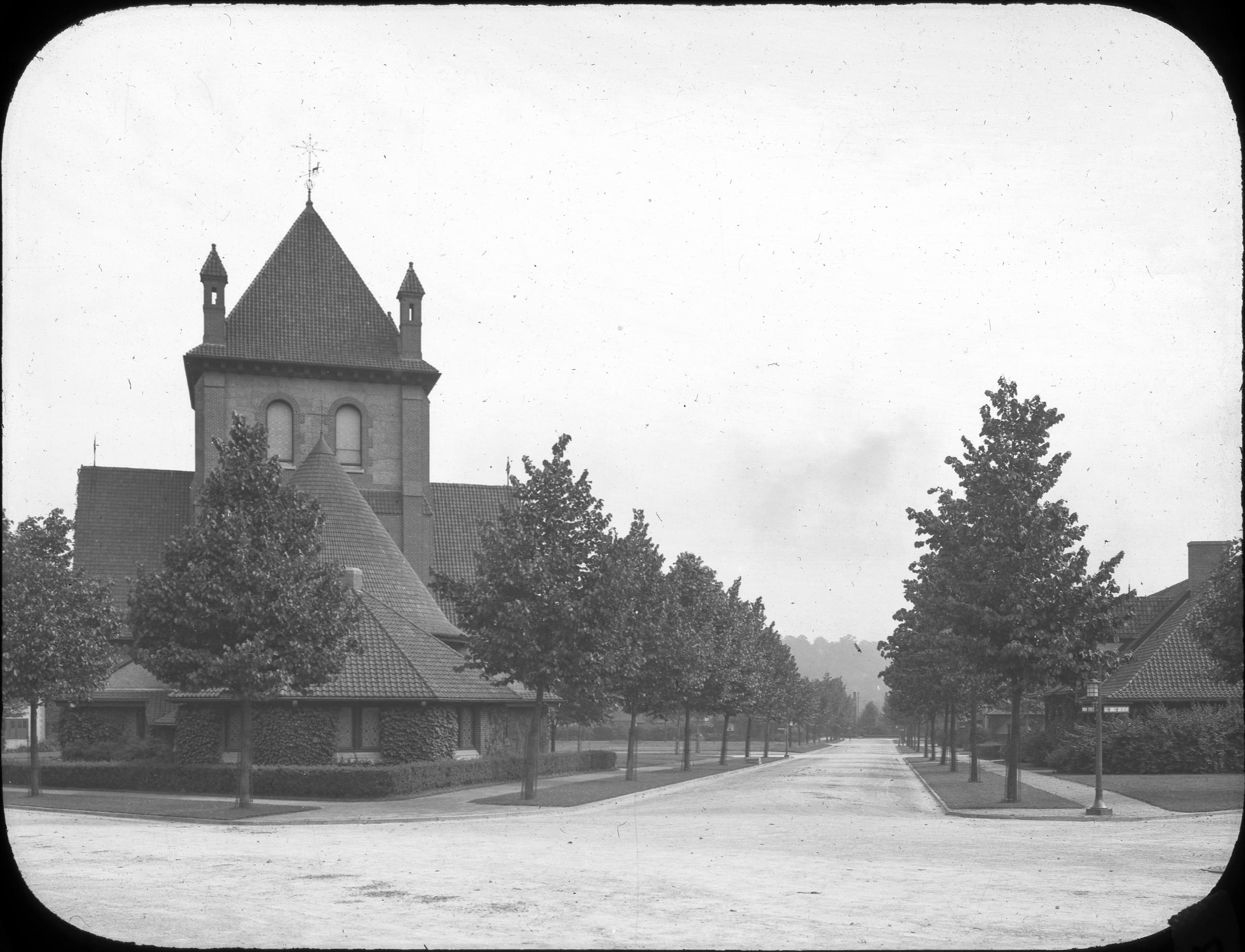

== See also ==
- List of the Episcopal cathedrals of the United States
- List of cathedrals in the United States
