= Gomez Mill House =

Historic house in New York, United States

- U.S. National Register of Historic Places
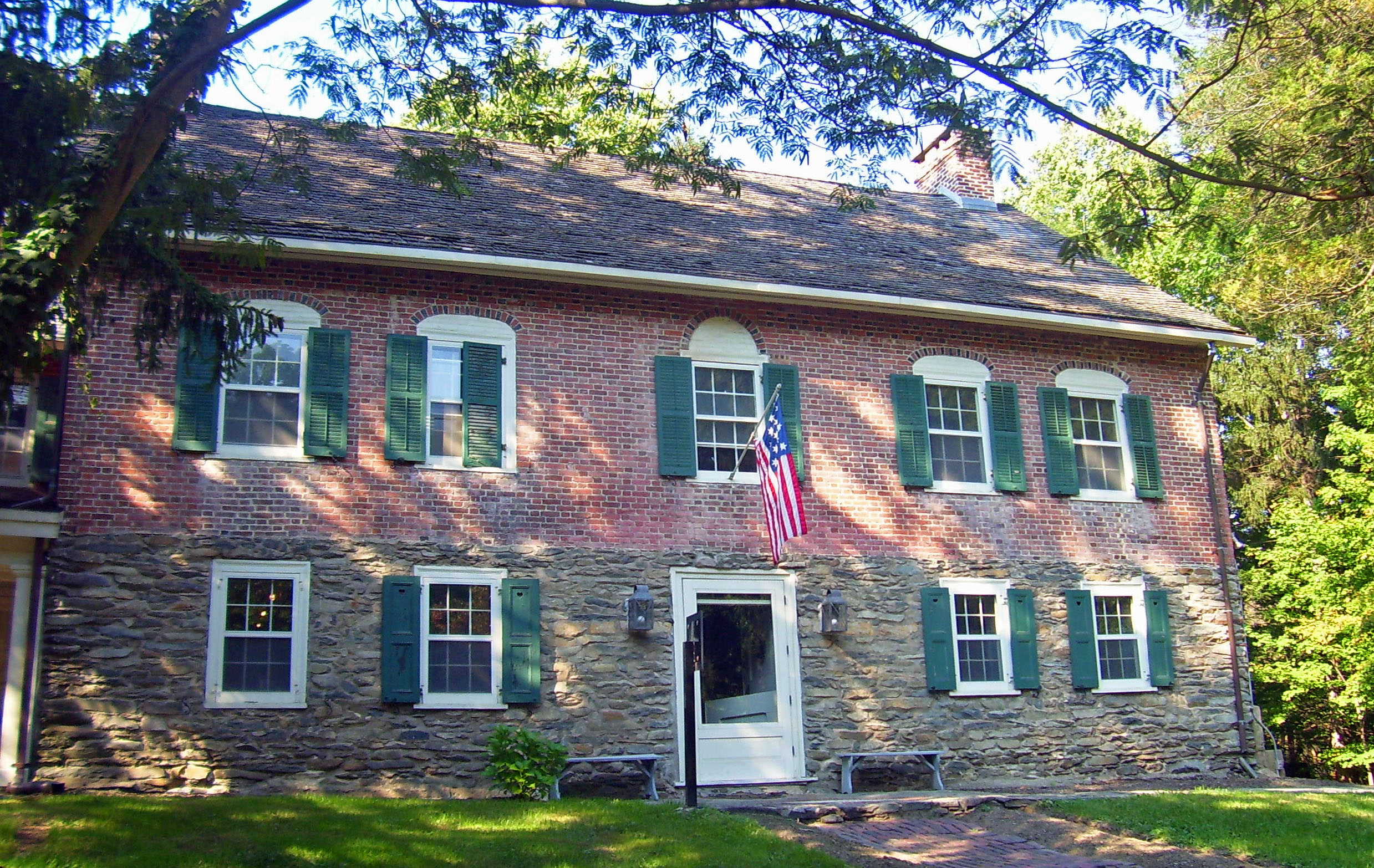
- Mill House in 2007. Original 1714 fieldstone still visible in first story.
- Location: Town of Newburgh, NY
- Nearest city: Newburgh
- Coordinates: 41°35′12″N 73°58′53″W
- Built: 1714
- Architect: Jacob and Daniel Gomez (first floor); Wolfert Acker (second floor and attic)
- NRHP reference No.: 73001245
- Added to NRHP: 1973

The Gomez Mill House is located in the Town of Newburgh, New York, US, on Mill House Road a short distance off US 9W, just south of the Orange–Ulster county line (its mailing address is in nearby Marlboro, in the latter). Over 300 years old, it is the earliest known surviving Jewish dwelling in North America and the oldest home in Orange County listed on the National Register of Historic Places.

== History ==
Luis Moses Gomez, a Sephardic Jewish merchant and trader whose Spanish Jewish ancestors fled to France to escape from the Spanish Inquisition for the New World, came to New York in the late 1690s. In 1705 he was granted an Act of Denization from Anne, Queen of Great Britain, which he purchased for 56 pounds British Sterling. This document gave him rights to conduct business, own property, and live freely within the British Colonies without an oath of allegiance to the Church of England. Gomez established himself as a prominent businessman and leader within the early Jewish community of New York. In 1714, he purchased 1,000 acres (400 ha) in Marlboro on the west side of the Hudson River in the then-British colony of New York. Subsequently, he and three of his sons, Jacob, Daniel and David, acquired an additional 3,000 acres (1,200 ha). The property was located where several old Native American paths converged. Other pioneers, fleeing tyranny in Europe for the promise of a new life, then settled in the Hudson Valley. On the western border of the Gomez property, a single-story fieldstone block house with walls three feet (1 m) thick was built into the side of a hill alongside a stream that came to be known as Jews Creek. For over thirty years Daniel ran the thriving family lumber and limestone operations along Jews Creek and the Hudson River, while offering goods for sale and trade at the stone blockhouse, which remains today as the foundation and first floor of the Gomez Mill House.

In 1772, shortly before the Revolutionary War, a Dutch colonist, Wolfert Acker, bought the property at a sheriff sale. He added a second story and attic using bricks made from local clay, bringing the main part of the house into its present form. He would serve with the local militia and chair the area's Committee of Safety during the war.

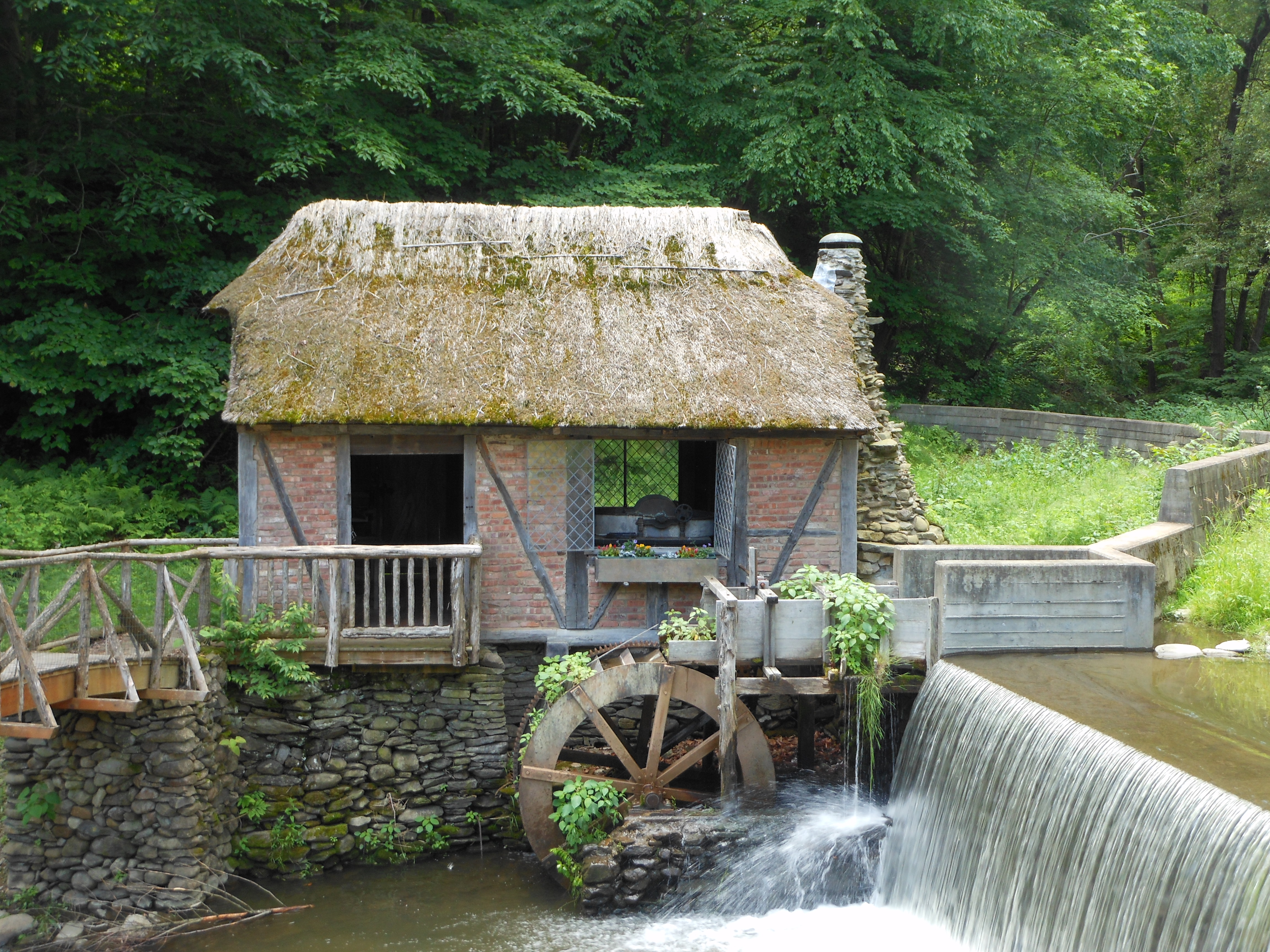
The Dard Hunter Mill

In 1835, Mill House was purchased by a wealthy landowner, Edward Armstrong. Following his death, it passed to his wife Sarah. Their eldest son, William Henry inherited the site and moved into the house in 1862. His brother was the artist and diplomat Maitland Armstrong. During the half-century William Henry and his family lived there, the kitchen wing and garden walls were added. During the next century, it had several other owners, the most notable being Dard Hunter, a papermaker associated with the Arts and Crafts movement. He bought the Mill House in 1912 and built a small paper mill on the property in the shape of a Devonshire cottage, complete with thatched roof. Over the next seven years he initiated and explored his lifelong career in hand papermaking and printing and produced some of his signature work. He sold it in 1918 in anticipation of military service. He claimed in his autobiography that a representative of the Russian government bought it for use as a school, but the real buyer was progressive activist Martha Gruening, who intended to establish a libertarian school in the building.

After World War II, in 1947, it was purchased by Mildred and Jeffrey Starin with a G.I loan. It became home to Mildred Starin and her family for the next 50 years. They were the first to recognize its historic significance. Mildred, a recognized antique dealer in the Hudson Valley, got the property listed on the National Register in 1973. Eleven years later, the New York City-based Gomez Foundation for Mill House, which had been established by descendants of Luis Moses Gomez and other interested parties in 1979, purchased the house to operate it as a museum, which it does today.
