= Martha Gruening =

American poet

Martha Gruening (1889–1937) was an American-Jewish journalist, poet, suffragette, and civil rights activist, born in Philadelphia. Gruening was an early advocate for the intersectionality of gender, race, and class. Her writings and research for the NAACP led to the advancement of the civil rights movement and worked to include women of color in the fight for women's suffrage.

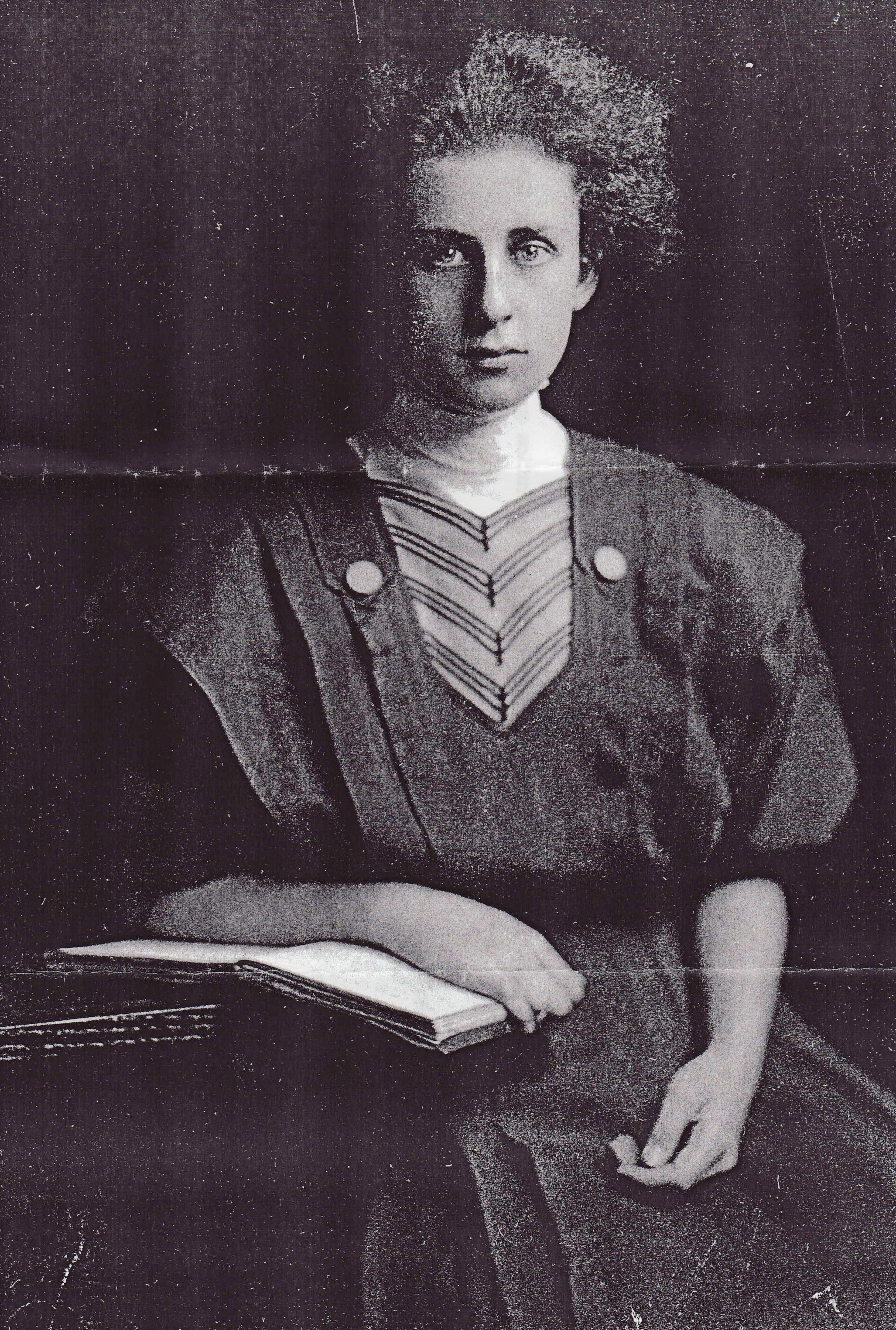
Martha Gruening - Smith College ca 1909

== Early life and education ==
Martha Gruening was born in Philadelphia in 1889 as one of five siblings. Her father was a renowned physician, and encouraged open discussions about political and social inequality within the United States. As a Jewish woman, she faced her own form of discrimination, but was otherwise privileged enough to pursue higher education. She attended the Ethical Culture School in New York, which reflected the progressive ideals of her family. In 1909, she graduated from Smith College, a private liberal arts college for women. Here, she founded the college league of the National American Woman’s Suffrage Association (NAWSA), to promote women's suffrage - which she later broke from over “its refusal to seat an African American delegate at its 1912 convention in Atlanta to placate increasingly powerful southern members”.

Gruening’s educational career was reignited by her participation in the Philadelphia Shirtwaist Strike (1909-1910). In response to heightened neglect and a desire for increase in wages, women laborers held a prolonged strike with much opposition. Gruening, who advocated for women’s rights, picketed for weeks until she was arrested. At night court, Gruening informed the magistrate for the reason of her daily visits to the factory, “to determine whether the police were arresting workers justly”, to which the magistrate responded, “it is women of your class...who have stirred up all this strife”. This provided another example for Gruening of the disparity in treatment towards women. In response to her participation and arrest, Gruening was sent to Moyamensing Prison, which she later wrote about in her publications. Her detailing of the “horrors in the prison cell” renewed the drive of reformers and led to more contributions. After being arrested, Gruening was moved by what she learned about police conduct, the legal system, economic inequality, and the power of journalism. After working as a freelance journalist and traveling across the United States as an organizer for the women’s suffrage movement, she enrolled in the New York University of Law in 1914. Her level of education was exceptional for a woman in this time period.

== Notable works ==
Martha Gruening’s work as a poet reflected her progressive social views. Before the U.S.’s involvement in WWI, a campaign arose, coined the Preparedness Campaign. This campaign sought to strengthen the U.S. military and gain public support to send troops into war. To foster discussion over U.S. military intervention and patriotism, The Masses magazine invited socialist thinkers to share their thoughts about patriotism. Martha Gruening responded with a poem she titled Prepared. It is a one stanza poem that asserts the narrative voice of an American. The narrator reflects on their current freedom to commit any act and decides that violence is a just defense of their freedoms. Gruening provides insight into her idea of patriotism, indicating that she condemns the parading of the word by a society whose actions do not promote liberty and justice but instead commits acts that prevent them.

Many iconic figures spoke out about their opinions on the movement and its achievements for African American culture during the Harlem Renaissance. In her essay Negro Renaissance (1932), Martha Gruening discusses her thoughts on the state of the movement and some of the more constructive writings that came about. Though Gruening believed that the movement had made achievements, she admits that it had been “...ballyhooed and exploited commercially and socially…”. Gruening also mentions Alain Locke’s idea of a “common consciousness.” She wrote that there seemed more individual works or works of a “definite consciousness” in the Harlem Renaissance. Additionally, Gruening adds that Langston Hughes’ Not Without Laughter and Willa Cather’s My Antonia are both constructive expressions of African American writers. She writes that they are both stories where “...Color is an added element” that they are not just stories about families of Color. Gruening saw the benefit of works that showcased mundane but genuine stories written by African Americans, as opposed to other works where authors seemed to “conform to white standards.”

Gruening is also well known for her career with the NAACP and The Crisis magazine. Her friendship with chief editor W. E. B. Du Bois stemmed from their shared interest of social equality. Both Gruening and Du Bois criticized the women’s suffrage movement for excluding Black women from participating in the organization. W.E.B Du Bois cited her in his article titled "Suffering Suffragettes," in which he condemns racism within the suffrage movement and praises Gruening for fighting for the inclusion of women of color. In her own article “Two Suffrage Movements,” Martha Gruening states that the suffrage movement began in response to the abolition movement. She argues that women could not advocate for the freedom of slaves without also fighting for freedom for themselves or realizing the parallels in their circumstances. Gruening states that both slaves and white women had been disenfranchised, deprived of an education, and not seen as humans in the government’s eyes. However, fighting against gender inequality was not favored by everyone. “It was finally carried by a small majority, but throughout the discussion, only two of those present, Elizabeth Cady Stanton and Frederick Douglass, warmly favored it. They alone at this stage seem to have grasped the fact that all rights and privileges go back to this most fundamental right. Throughout the storm of ridicule and abuse which broke out after the convention, Douglass maintained his position and brilliantly defended the convention in his paper, The North Star.” Martha Gruening directly cites Sojourner Truth at the Akron convention, quoted from the “Reminiscence of Mrs. Frances D. Gage.” She says that incidents like Truth’s are far too frequent, and reformers from both sides frequently ignore the parallels between slaves and women. Gruening concludes that everyone, regardless of color or gender, must understand that “the disenfranchised of the earth have a common cause.”

Gruening's essay "With Malice Afterthought" was published in The Forum (American magazine) in January 1916. Here, she vehemently advocated against the death penalty by writing the story of a Frank Johnson. The essay recounts Johnson's attempts to kill himself, only to be stopped by the doctors at the prison. The doctors then nurse him back to health until he begins to want to live again. Then, they execute him. Although short, it is an emotional and seminal article that conveys the horrific side of the death penalty.

Gruening served as the assistant secretary to the National Association for the Advancement of Colored People and wrote reports on national events for the association. Gruening's research on lynchings within the United States was fundamental to the NAACP. Aided by the NAACP Field Investigator Helen Boardman, Gruening helped organize verifiable data into the NAACP's first book, Thirty Years of Lynching in the United States 1889-1918. The two women gathered all of the data manually, documenting 2,224 lynchings: 702 whites (11 female), 2,522 “colored” (50 female). The information was accompanied by 100 individual accounts of lynchings, including the stories of 11 women (four pregnant) that confronted general perceptions of lynching. The book and Gruening's research was essential in raising awareness of the horror of lynchings in the United States.

Gruening, aside from writing of her work on the field, wrote many book reviews for the different publications she worked for. In her review of Theodore Stanton’s, The Life and Letters of Elizabeth Cady Stanton (1922), Gruening celebrates Stanton’s strength and unwillingness to conform to societal standards for women. In her review, Gruening also tells of Stanton’s presence at the World Anti-Slavery Convention and how in addition to its significance to the abolition movement, it also signified to Stanton a push towards “the emancipation of women” due to its “exclusion of the women delegates”. Aside from writing of her approval and honoring of Stanton’s achievements, Gruening also implies her view that African-American women should have a place within the women's movement, addressing Stanton’s estrangement with Abolitionists who disregarded African-American women in the case of the Fourteenth Amendment. Gruening remarks upon Stanton’s question in response to their disregard, “Is the African race composed entirely of males?” to which Gruening adds, “a question not without interest today when a considerable number of feminists apparently believe that only the caucausian race has any females”.

== Legacy ==
Martha Gruening both participated in and wrote about progressive education in Europe. In 1917, she adopted a young African American boy named David Butt and raised him as a single mother against a backdrop of societal prejudice and economic uncertainty. She was intent upon founding a libertarian school so that he and other children, regardless of race or background, could receive an education. Unfortunately, the school did not succeed, and David Butt died tragically young at twenty-five. After her son's death, she continued to advocate for the civil rights of African-Americans until the end. On October 28, 1937, at age 48, Martha Gruening suffered a brain aneurysm which took her life. Her legacy is defined by the work she did for the NAACP and how she fought for the rights of others.

== Gomez Mill House ==
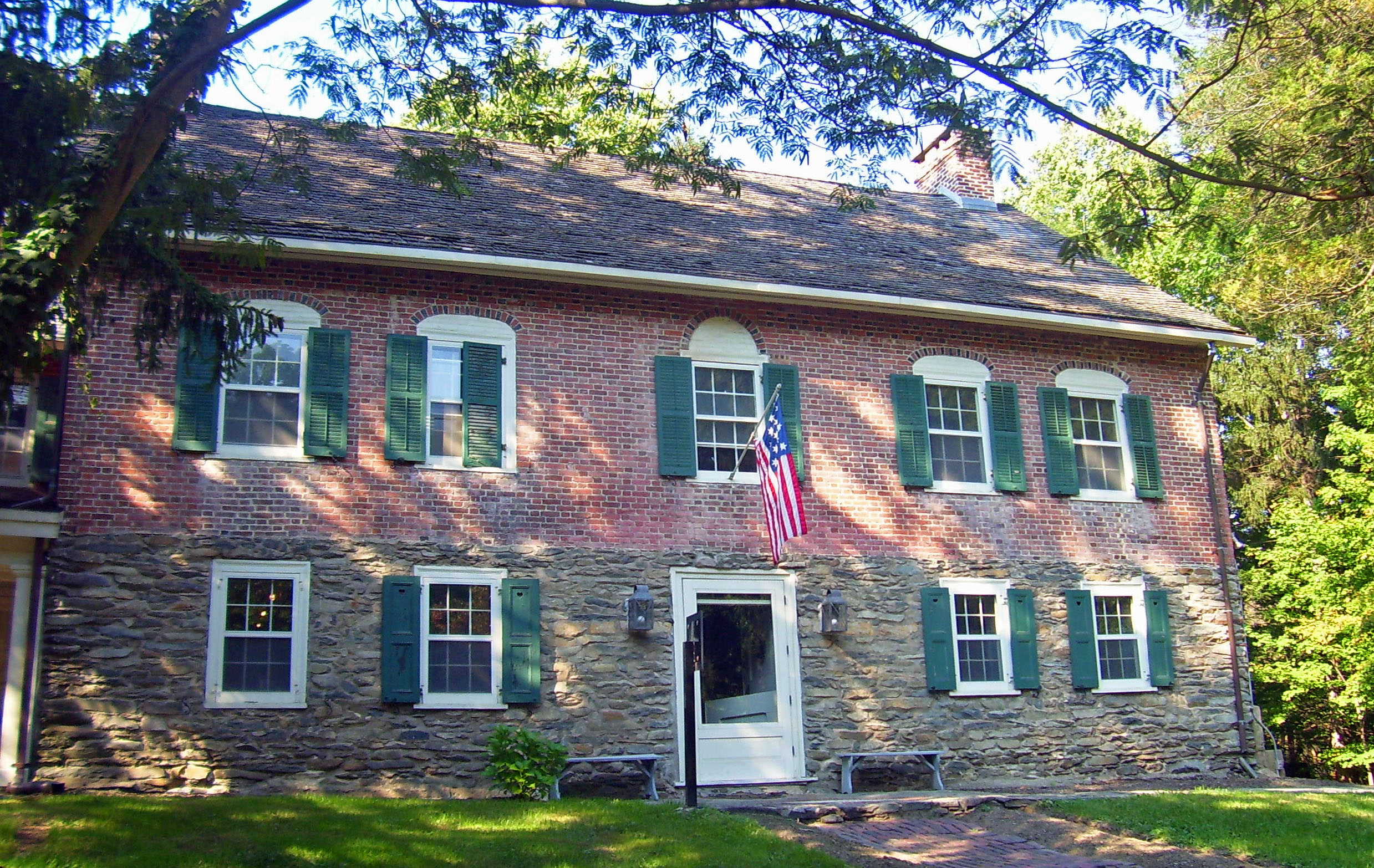
An image of the Gomez Mill House, which Gruening bought in 1918 for her and her newly adopted son

Three years after having adopted an African-American child, David Butt, son of two African-American theatre performers from South Carolina, Gruening bought the Gomez Mill House, in 1918 to provide him a proper education. She set up Mill House as a “Libertarian International School” that provided education for children of all races. Martha encouraged progressive European models of education and partnered with Helen Boardman, an NAACP collaborator. Though it was listed as established in a 1921 almanac, there has been no further evidence that the school ever opened to the public. Later, Gruening allowed for the Gomez Mill House to be sold in 1923 by Helen Boardman.
