= Elliot–Buckley House =

Historic house in New York, United States

- U.S. National Register of Historic Places
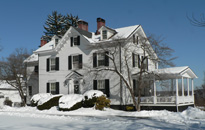
- Elliot-Buckley House, February 2008

- Location within New York Location within the United States
- Location: 204 Old Post Rd., near Marlboro, New York
- Coordinates: 41°35′04″N 73°58′14″W
- Area: 2.79 acres (1.13 ha)
- Built: c. 1843, c. 1924
- Architectural style: Picturesque, Colonial Revival
- NRHP reference No.: 11000710
- Added to NRHP: September 29, 2011

Elliot–Buckley House, also known as Riverview, is a historic home located near Marlboro, Ulster County, New York. The house was built about 1843, and is a two-story, T-shaped, Picturesque influenced heavy timber frame dwelling with a cross-gable roof. It has a raised basement and is sheathed in clapboard. The house was remodeled in the Colonial Revival style and an addition built about 1924. Also on the property is a contributing octagonal well house. It was built by Dr. Daniel Elliot, and sold to the Buckley family in 1866.

It was listed on the National Register of Historic Places in 2011.
