= Maitland Armstrong =

American lawyer and artist (1836–1918)

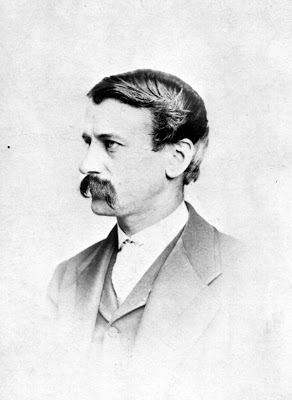
David Maitland Armstrong

David Maitland Armstrong (April 15, 1836 – May 26, 1918) was Charge d'Affaires to the Papal States (1869), American Consul in Rome (1869–71), and Consul General in Rome (1871–73). He was also an important stained-glass artist and a painter.

== Early life ==
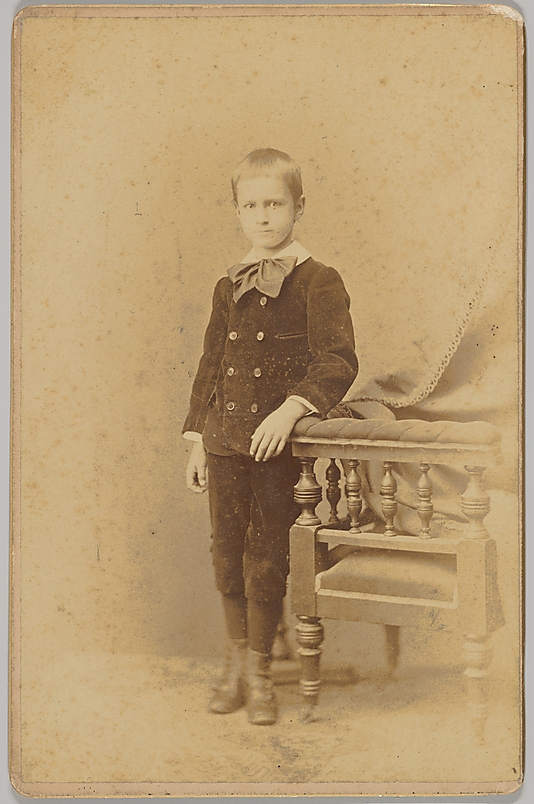
David Maitland Armstrong c. 1846

Armstrong was born in Newburgh, New York in 1836 and educated at Trinity College, Hartford, Connecticut from 1854. He was the youngest of four sons of Edward Armstrong (1800–1840), a prominent local farmer, and his wife, Sarah Hartley Ward (1801–1853) of Charleston, South Carolina. Edward Armstrong added to the land already acquired by his father, until eventually he owned farms extending along a nearly two mile frontage of the Hudson River, and built a substantial house, the Edward Armstrong Mansion, now demolished, but with its huge Ionic columns on display in the grounds of the Storm King Art Center.

His grandfather was Colonel William Armstrong, who came from Scotland with the British Army during the American Revolution. His grandfather was present at the Battle of Yorktown, as was his wife's grandfather, Colonel Nicholas Fish, but he was on the winning side. In his memoirs, Maitland wonders if they ever met.

His brothers were William Henry, Gouverneur, and John Armstrong. William Henry Armstrong (and his family) lived at Gomez Mill House from 1835 to 1904, the earliest surviving Jewish residence in the US, and now a museum, with several of Maitland Armstrong's artworks on display.

In the autumn of 1858, Maitland Armstrong sailed to Italy, arriving just before the new year, where he spent months touring the country and making illustrations of the scenery and ancient monuments.

== Life in Italy ==
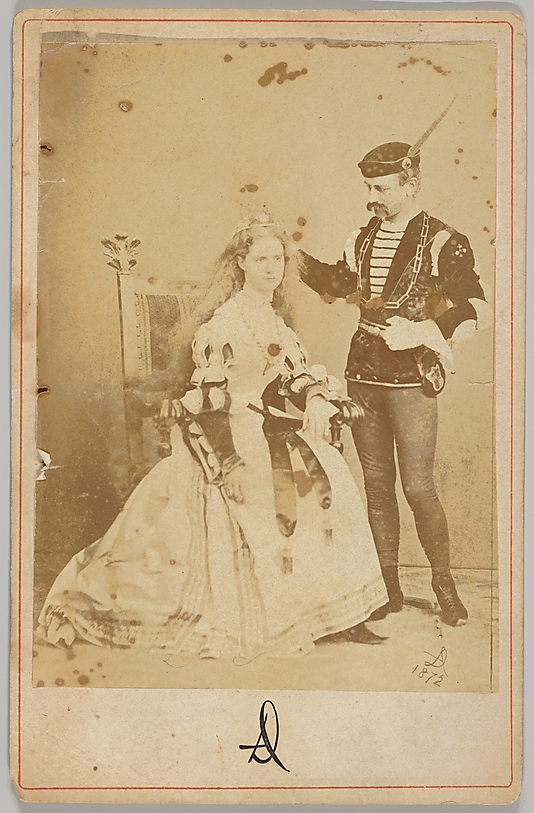
Armstrong and wife Helen in Rome, wearing 15th-century style "fancy dress"

Armstrong was American Consul in Rome, 1869–71, Charge d'Affaires to the Papal States 1869 and Consul General in Rome 1871–73.

Armstrong's duties required him to make the acquaintance of as many Americans in Rome as possible, which he undertook with enthusiasm. Many were artists who became lifelong friends, such as Elihu Vedder, Charles C. Coleman, George Inness and George Healy. He also met Augustus Saint-Gaudens.

== 1878 Paris Exposition Universelle ==
Armstrong was appointed Director of American Fine Arts at the 1878 Paris Exposition Universelle. He had a great deal of difficulty negotiating which pictures were to be shown, as the committee making recommendations preferred only well-established artists, and Armstrong wished to include young and less-established painters such as Winslow Homer and John La Farge. When it came to the hang, works were positioned according to merit with the best "on the line" and lesser works nearer the ceiling. This engendered resentment from established artists who found their work placed further up the wall. At this time, former U.S. President Ulysses S. Grant was on a long world tour, and Armstrong met him several times socially and to show him around the Exposition. Armstrong was awarded the Légion d'honneur for his work on the Exposition.

== Painting ==
Armstrong's paintings were mainly of landscapes and picturesque country scenes.

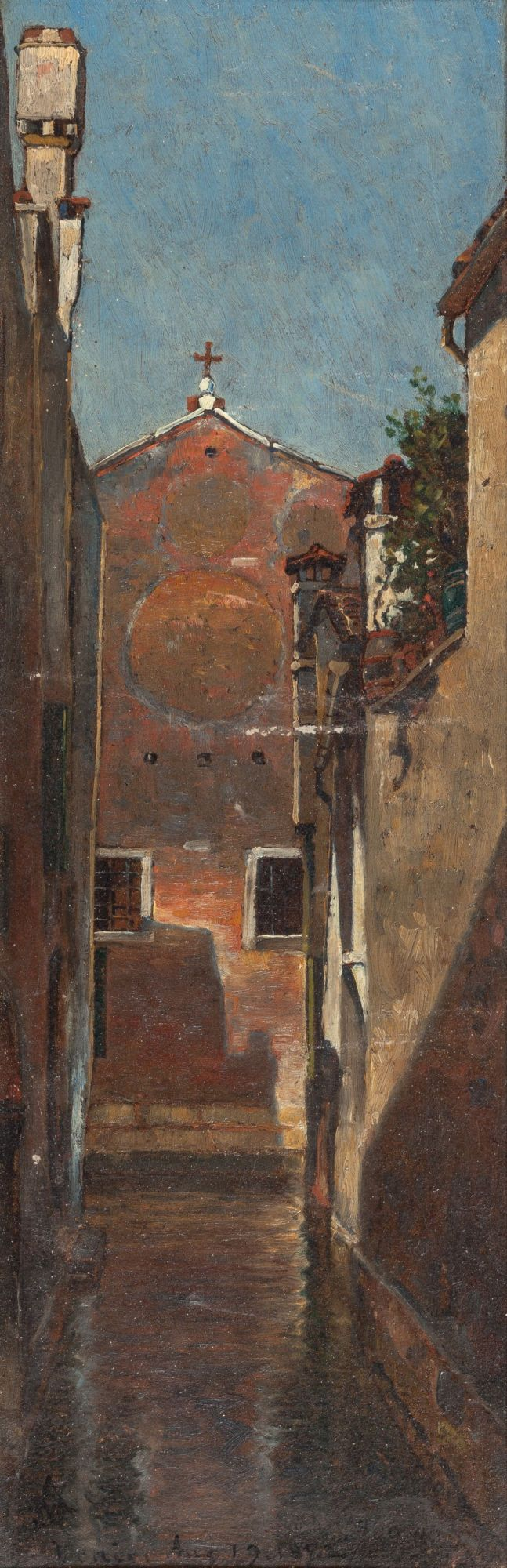
Venice. Oil on board, 1872. Private collection.

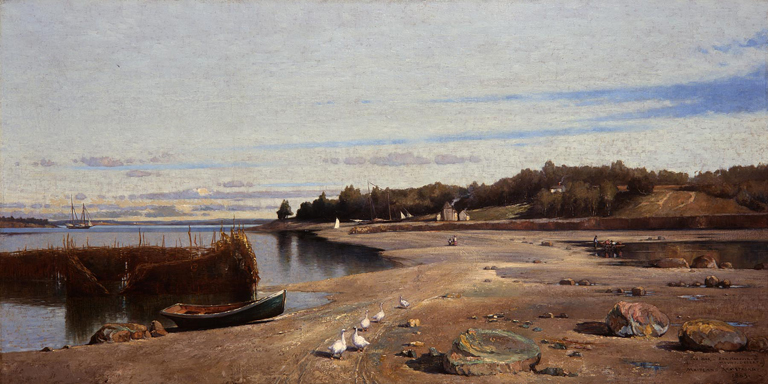
The Bar, Bar Harbor, Mt. Desert (Maine). Oil on canvas, 1877. Reworked 1883. Milwaukee Art Museum.

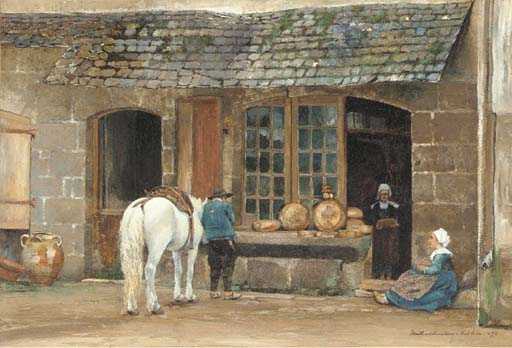
A Baker's Shop in Brittany. Oil on canvas, 1878.

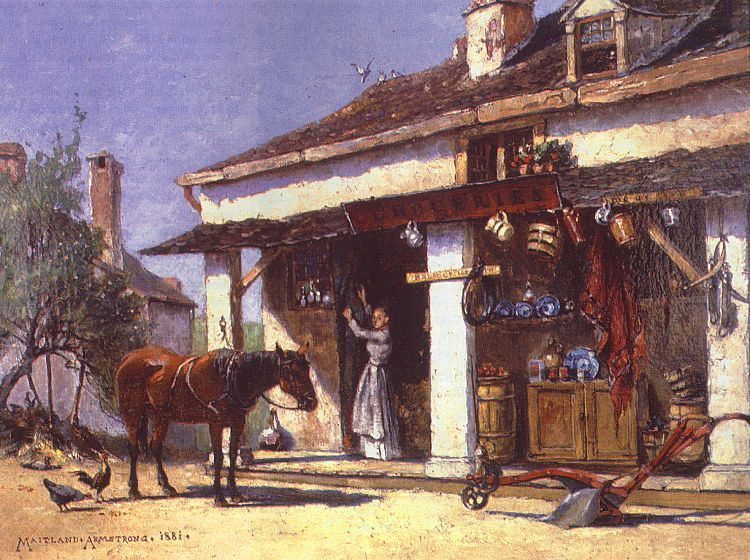
Store on the Erie Canal. 1881. Possibly painted from memory of Armstrong's trip along the canal in 1880.

== Stained glass ==
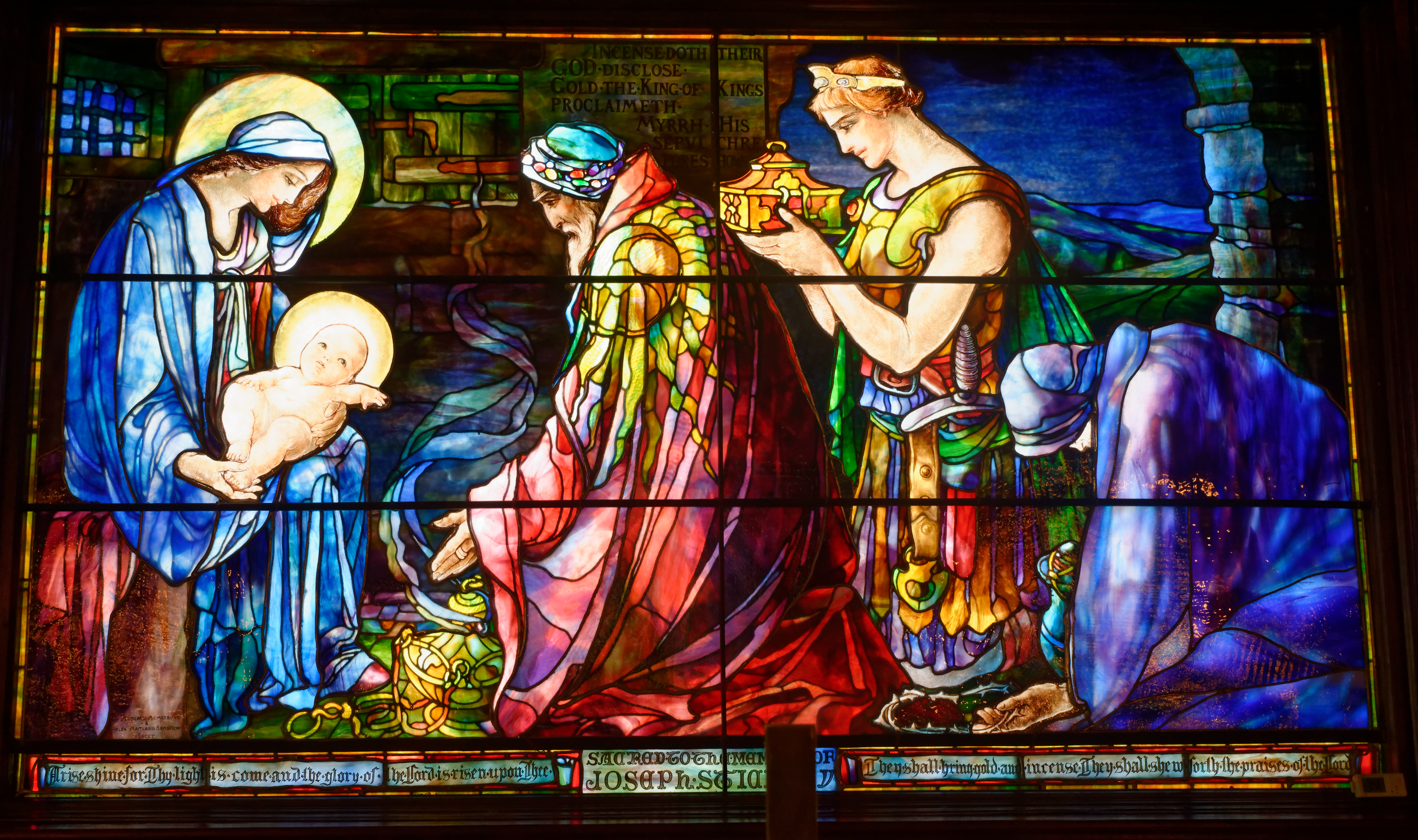
Stained-glass window at Faith Chapel, titled The Adoration of the Christ Child

From the 1880s, Armstrong worked with his friends Louis C. Tiffany and John La Farge. In 1887 he formed his own firm, Maitland Armstrong and Co., of New York.

Later, his daughter Helen Maitland Armstrong (1869–1948) joined him in the business and she became an important stained-glass artist in her own right. Works created included important installations at the Appellate Court Building in New York, Vanderbilt's All Souls Church in Biltmore Village (Asheville, NC), and the Church of the Ascension in New York, where he was a parishioner.

Armstrong was one of the foremost exponents of American-style opalescent stained glass during the American Renaissance or Gilded Age. He had already been influenced by classical art even before he arrived in Italy. One of his professors at college upbraided him for choosing to paint a copy of a Venus Rising From The Sea rather than studying William Whewell's Elements of Morality as he should have done.

== Family ==
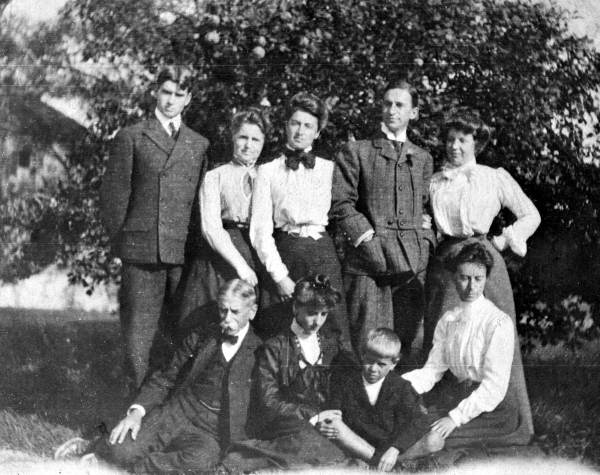
The Armstrong family c. 1910s. Front row, left to right: D. Maitland, Helen Maitland, Hamilton Fish, and Margaret Neilson Armstrong. Standing, left to right: Noel, Helena, Marion, Edward Maitland, Maud Gwendolyn King (Edward's wife).

Armstrong married Helen Neilson, a descendant of Peter Stuyvesant and a niece of Hamilton Fish. They had seven children, six of whom survived to adulthood. Helen Maitland Armstrong (1869–1948) followed in her father's footsteps in the family business. Her sister Margaret Neilson Armstrong (1867–1944) became a noted book designer and later novelist and biographer, while their brother Hamilton (Ham) Fish Armstrong, was editor of the influential U.S. foreign policy journal Foreign Affairs from 1928 to 1972. The other children were Marion Howard Armstrong (1880-1957), who married Alfred Edey, Noel Maitland Armstrong (1882-1938), and Edward Maitland Armstrong (1874-1915).

He died at his home at 58 West Tenth Street, New York, which is now sometimes known as the D. Maitland Armstrong House. Armstrong purchased number 58 in 1890 and refurbished it, adding decorative flourishes in leaded stained glass and wrought iron. The Tenth Street Studio Building (now demolished), was built at number 51 in 1858 for artists, and became the centre of artistic life in New York for the rest of that century. The New York Times notes that "For some people, West 10th Street between Fifth and Sixth Avenues is the most beautiful block in New York City."
