= Dee Brown (baseball) =

American baseball player (born 1978)

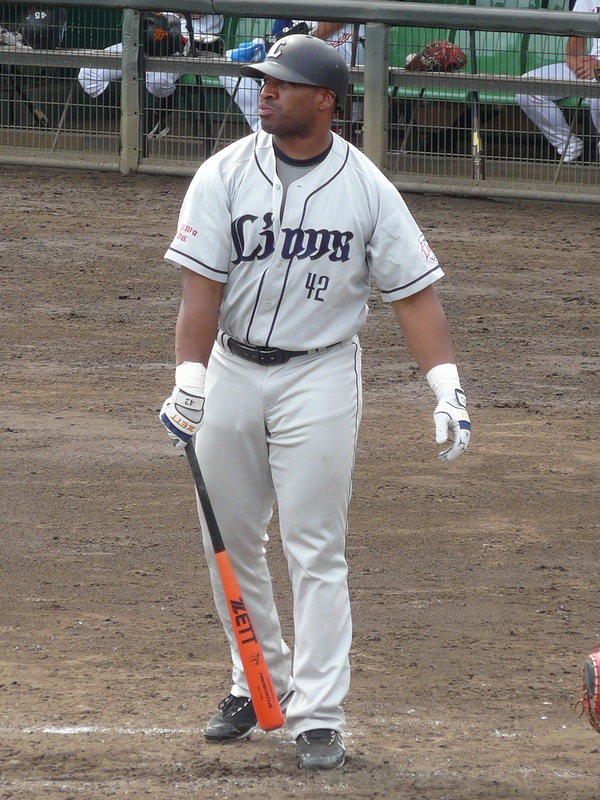
- Left fielder
- Born: March 27, 1978 (age 48); The Bronx, New York, U.S.
- Batted: Left Threw: Right

Professional debut
- MLB: September 14, 1998, for the Kansas City Royals
- NPB: March 20, 2010, for the Saitama Seibu Lions

Last appearance
- MLB: September 18, 2007, for the Oakland Athletics
- NPB: July 13, 2011, for the Saitama Seibu Lions

MLB statistics
- Batting average: .233
- Home runs: 14
- Runs batted in: 89

NPB statistics
- Batting average: .230
- Home runs: 21
- Runs batted in: 81
- Stats at Baseball Reference

Teams
- Kansas City Royals (1998–2004); Oakland Athletics (2007); Saitama Seibu Lions (2010–2011)

Dermal Bram "Dee" Brown (born March 27, 1978) is an American former professional baseball outfielder. Brown played for the Kansas City Royals and Oakland Athletics of Major League Baseball and the Saitama Seibu Lions of Nippon Professional Baseball.

== Career ==
Brown attended Marlboro Central High School in Marlboro, New York, where he played baseball and football. In football, he rushed for the second-most yards in New York high school history and scored 75 touchdowns. As a junior baseball player, he hit .470 with eight home runs. He committed to play both college baseball and college football at the University of Maryland, College Park, for the Maryland Terrapins. Brown was named to the ABCA/Rawlings High School All-America First Team by the American Baseball Coaches Association and Rawlings.

The Kansas City Royals selected Brown in the first round, with the 14th overall selection, of the Kansas City Royals in the 1996 Major League Baseball draft. Brown played for the Royals in parts of major league seasons from 1998 through 2004. He spent all of the 2005 and 2006 seasons in the minor leagues with the Wichita Wranglers, Kansas City's Double-A Affiliate. On December 30, 2006, Brown signed a minor league contract with an invitation to spring training with the Arizona Diamondbacks and was assigned to the Tucson Sidewinders, Arizona's Triple-A affiliate. On May 30, 2007, Brown was traded to the Oakland Athletics for cash considerations. In December 2007, Brown signed a minor league contract with the Los Angeles Angels of Anaheim and spent the entire 2008 season in Triple-A and became a free agent after the season. He signed a minor league contract with the Los Angeles Dodgers for the 2009 season. He hit .295 with 19 homers and 80 RBI with the AAA Albuquerque Isotopes in 2009.

Brown signed with the Saitama Seibu Lions of Nippon Professional Baseball in Japan for the 2010 season and returned to the Lions in the 2011 season.
