= Marlboro, New York =

- CDP
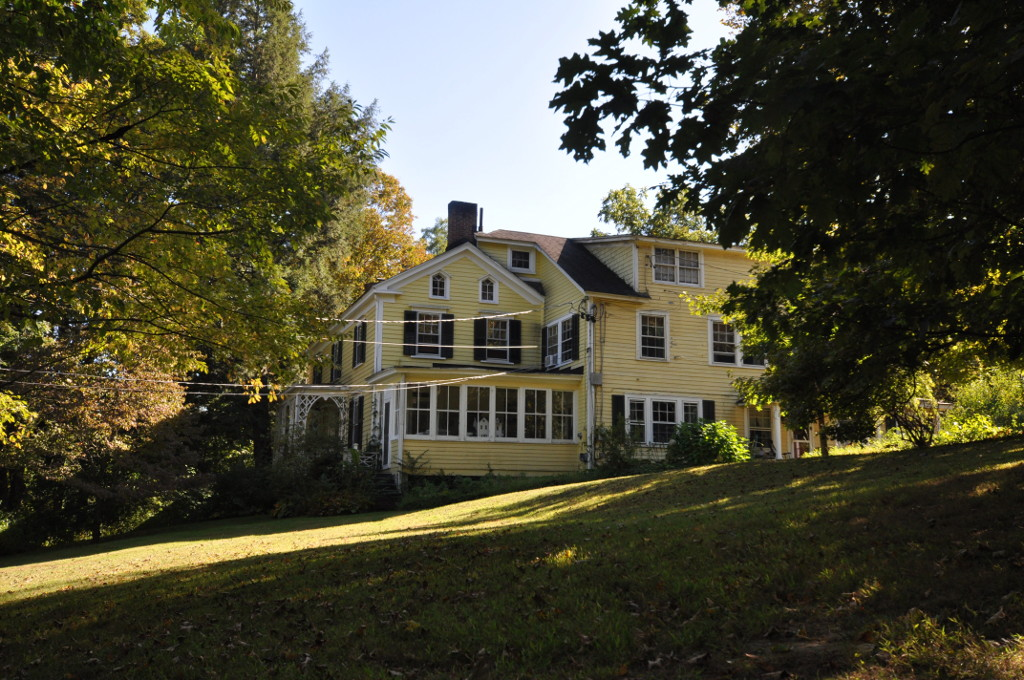
- Shady Brook Farm, a historic home located in Marlboro

- Location in Ulster County and the state of New York.
- Coordinates: 41°36′17″N 73°58′29″W
- Country: United States
- State: New York
- County: Ulster

Area
  - Total: 5.63 sq mi (14.57 km^{2})
  - Land: 4.98 sq mi (12.91 km^{2})
  - Water: 0.64 sq mi (1.66 km^{2})
- Elevation: 180 ft (55 m)

Population (2020)
  - Total: 3,699
  - Density: 742.1/sq mi (286.52/km^{2})
- Time zone: UTC-5 (EST)
  - Summer (DST): UTC-4 (EDT)
- ZIP code: 12542
- Area code: 845
- FIPS code: 36-45700
- GNIS feature ID: 0956544

Marlboro is a hamlet (and census-designated place) in Ulster County, New York, United States. The population was 3,669 at the 2020 census. Marlboro is in the southeastern part of the town of Marlborough, located in the southeastern corner of the county.

== History ==
The community was the site of the first settlement in the town, around 1697. The Chapel Hill Bible Church, Christ Episcopal Church, Dubois-Sarles Octagon, Elliot–Buckley House, and Shady Brook Farm are listed on the National Register of Historic Places. Marlboro is also the location of the Gomez Mill House, an historical site which is the oldest Jewish residence in Ulster County. It was additionally the first paper mill in Ulster County.

== Geography ==
Marlboro is located at 41°36′17″N 73°58′29″W (41.604693, -73.974822).

According to the United States Census Bureau, the CDP has a total area of 3.3 square miles (8.5 km^{2}), of which 2.8 square miles (7.3 km^{2}) is land and 0.6 square miles (1.5 km^{2}, or 17.61%) is water.

The community is on the west bank of the Hudson River.

== Demographics ==
Historical population
| Census | Pop. | Note | %± |
|---|---|---|---|
| 2000 | 2,339 | | — |
| 2010 | 3,699 | | 58.1% |
| 2020 | 3,699 | | 0.0% |
U.S. Decennial Census

=== 2020 census ===
As of the 2020 census, Marlboro had a population of 3,699. The median age was 42.9 years. 20.9% of residents were under the age of 18 and 19.8% of residents were 65 years of age or older. For every 100 females there were 98.9 males, and for every 100 females age 18 and over there were 93.6 males age 18 and over.

92.7% of residents lived in urban areas, while 7.3% lived in rural areas.

There were 1,502 households in Marlboro, of which 27.7% had children under the age of 18 living in them. Of all households, 47.8% were married-couple households, 19.1% were households with a male householder and no spouse or partner present, and 25.2% were households with a female householder and no spouse or partner present. About 28.8% of all households were made up of individuals and 15.9% had someone living alone who was 65 years of age or older.

There were 1,667 housing units, of which 9.9% were vacant. The homeowner vacancy rate was 1.5% and the rental vacancy rate was 9.3%.

Racial composition as of the 2020 census
| Race | Number | Percent |
|---|---|---|
| White | 3,010 | 81.4% |
| Black or African American | 185 | 5.0% |
| American Indian and Alaska Native | 10 | 0.3% |
| Asian | 53 | 1.4% |
| Native Hawaiian and Other Pacific Islander | 1 | 0.0% |
| Some other race | 154 | 4.2% |
| Two or more races | 286 | 7.7% |
| Hispanic or Latino (of any race) | 465 | 12.6% |

=== 2000 census ===
As of the 2000 census, there were 2,339 people, 926 households, and 605 families residing in the CDP. The population density was 846.3 inhabitants per square mile (326.8/km^{2}). There were 981 housing units at an average density of 354.9 per square mile (137.0/km^{2}). The racial makeup of the CDP was 95.68% White, 1.84% African American, 0.26% Native American, 0.34% Asian, 0.81% from other races, and 1.07% from two or more races. Hispanic or Latino of any race were 4.96% of the population.

There were 926 households, out of which 32.2% had children under the age of 18 living with them, 51.2% were married couples living together, 9.9% had a female householder with no husband present, and 34.6% were non-families. 28.2% of all households were made up of individuals, and 12.3% had someone living alone who was 65 years of age or older. The average household size was 2.53 and the average family size was 3.14.

In the CDP, the population was spread out, with 26.0% under the age of 18, 6.4% from 18 to 24, 31.1% from 25 to 44, 21.7% from 45 to 64, and 14.8% who were 65 years of age or older. The median age was 37 years. For every 100 females, there were 93.8 males. For every 100 females age 18 and over, there were 89.4 males.

The median income for a household in the CDP was $43,073, and the median income for a family was $52,688. Males had a median income of $37,788 versus $28,542 for females. The per capita income for the CDP was $20,123. About 10.9% of families and 12.0% of the population were below the poverty line, including 16.1% of those under age 18 and 12.0% of those age 65 or over.

== Education ==
The school district is Marlboro Central School District.

The teachers of Marlboro Schools have been without a contract for over 140 days, which has caused 17% of teachers to resign from the district.

== Notable people ==
- Rob Bell - Former Major League Baseball player for the Cincinnati Reds, Texas Rangers and Tampa Bay Devil Rays
- Brian Benben - actor; star of Dream On on HBO.
- Dee Brown - Former Major League Baseball player for the Kansas City Royals
- Tom Cornell - journalist and peace activist.
- Wade Davis - Former Major League Baseball pitcher for the Tampa Bay Rays, Kansas City Royals, Chicago Cubs and Colorado Rockies
- John Esposito - Jazz pianist. Graduated from Marlboro High School June 1971. Teaches at Bard College.
- John M. Falcone - Police officer in Poughkeepsie, NY. Killed in the line of duty in February 2011.
- Scott Lobdell - Comic book writer and screenwriter.
- Nicole Polizzi - Person known as "Snooki" on MTV's reality television series Jersey Shore.
