= David Rumsey Map Collection =

One of the world's largest private map collections

- 1895 map of Buenos Aires, part of the collection
- Type: Cartographic materials
- Housed at: Stanford University; Cecil H. Green Library, David Rumsey Map Center
- Funded by: David Rumsey
- Size (no. of items): 200,000+ physical items 150,000+ digital items
- Website: davidrumsey.com

The David Rumsey Map Collection is one of the world's largest private map collections, numbering more than 200,000 physical maps and cartographic items and 150,000 digital materials. It was assembled by American collector and philanthropist David Rumsey, beginning in the 1980s. Harper's Magazine described Rumsey's efforts as "notable among collectors for having joined his love of the antiquarian with an enthusiasm for technological change" to create "a crucial resource for scholars and map enthusiasts." In 1999, it became one of the first large-scale map collections to be digitized and made freely available on the internet when Rumsey launched its website. The collection has served as a model for imaging and search technology, data visualization and archiving, digital engagement, and the use of new map-exploration tools such as georeferencing and virtual and augmented reality. It has also helped to spur the use of historical cartography as primary source material in research.

In 2009, Rumsey announced that he would donate the collection to Stanford University. It is now housed at the school's Green Library in the David Rumsey Map Center, which opened in 2016.

== Collection history and highlights ==
Rumsey's interest in maps stemmed from early childhood; he began collecting them in the early 1980s, when he was a real estate developer. He initially focused on 18th- and 19th-century maps of North and South America, an era that marked the rise of modern cartography and the linking of geography to data in social research. When he began, maps from those centuries were not in great demand by collectors, which enabled him to acquire large numbers inexpensively. In the 2000s, he expanded the collection's reach to include cartographic materials from the 16th through 21st centuries, covering the entirety of the Earth and beyond. Its diverse physical items include individual flat, rolled and pocket maps, school geographies, atlases, globes, maritime and celestial charts, timelines, World's Fair guides, wooden puzzle maps, and books of cartography, travel and exploration.

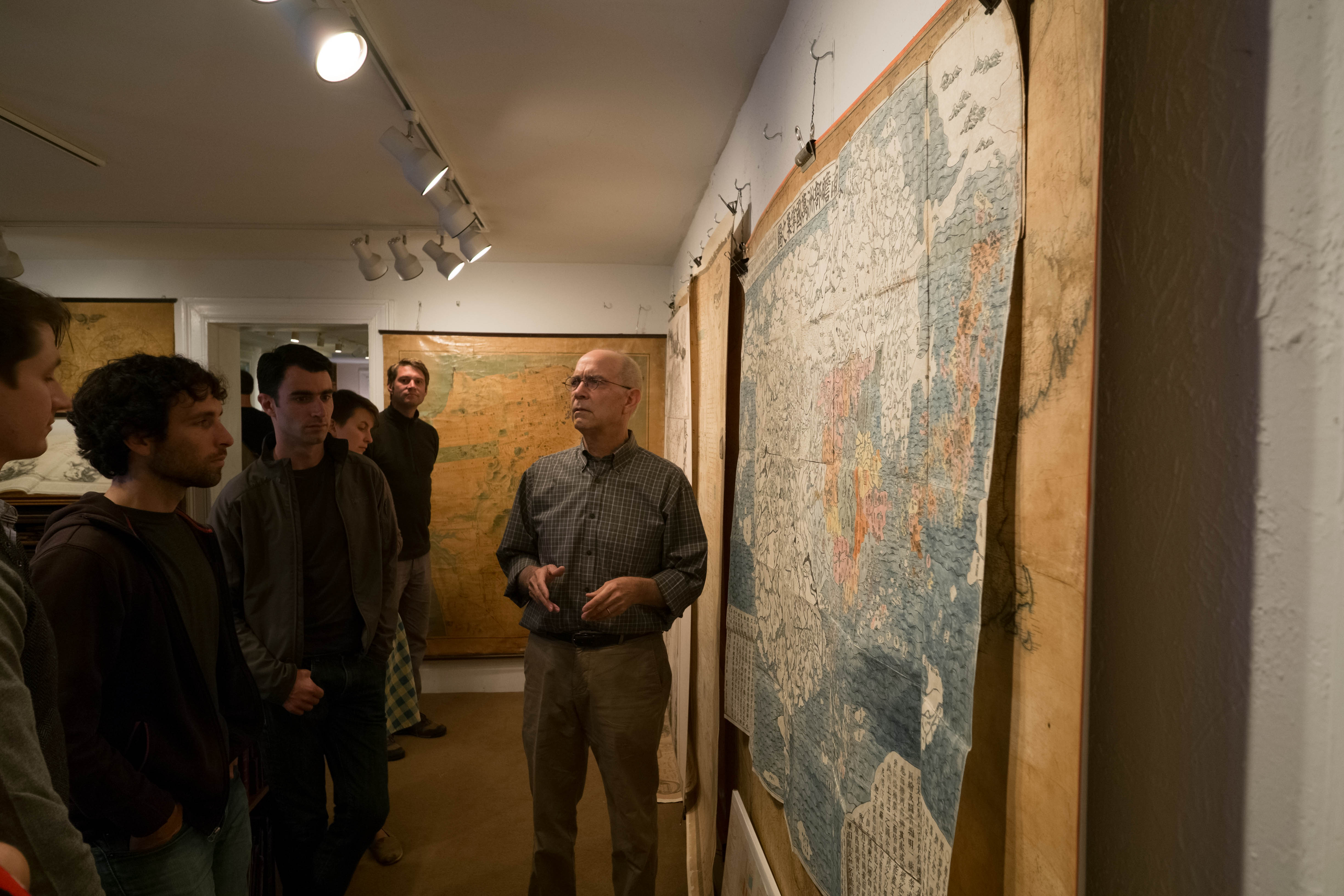
David Rumsey giving a guided tour of his collection.

Maps and charts in the collection that commenters have highlighted include: the Plan de Turgot, a highly detailed (e.g., indicating backyard gardens and wood piles), 1739 map of Paris consisting of twenty sheets in a book that in digital form were joined into a gigantic single image; a map from the first published edition of Lewis and Clark's Account of the Expedition (1814); 1816 and 1823 editions of famed cartographer John Melish's Map of the United States; birds-eye view Civil War-era maps depicting the Chesapeake Bay region and coastal theater of war by lithographer John Bachmann; and historian Sebastian C. Adams's 1881 Sychronological Chart of Universal History, a 23-foot-long timeline from 4004 B.C. to the late 19th century.

The collection also includes complete rare atlases and objects, among them: a leather-bound edition of the book considered to be the first true world atlas, Theatrum Orbis Terrarum (1570); cartographer Thomas Jefferys's American Atlas (1776) and West India Atlas (1788); an atlas for the blind from 1837; economist Francis Amasa Walker's statistical atlases based on late 19th-century U.S. censuses; an 1894 illustrated directory of downtown San Francisco, the only complete visual record of the area before much of it was destroyed by earthquake and fire in 1906; the first American printed globe by explorer James Wilson (1811); and a three-inch-diameter, 1731 pocket globe by James Cushee, which rests in a fishskin-covered, hinged case covered on the inside with a depiction of the sky and constellations.

=== Collection website ===
With the advent of digital technology and the internet, Rumsey started digitizing the collection in 1997, intending to make it freely and accessibly available for public viewing rather than merely preserving it an archive. He launched a website to display the maps in 1999, www.davidrumsey.com. In order to provide viewers with a detailed, hands-on experience, he collaborated with Luna Imaging, a digital-archiving company known for software that converted visual material into high-resolution images that could be readily manipulated for research. In addition to advanced software, the long-term project incorporated high-resolution scanning and robust compression and search engine technologies.

In 2001, the collection website became the first to make GIS (geographical information system) technology freely available, through a browser using visualization software that allowed users to overlay old maps on one another or with current geospatial data, like roads, lakes, parks, aerial photos and satellite imagery. The website won a 2002 International Academy of Digital Arts and Sciences Webby Award for technical achievement, among other web awards. In subsequent years the website incorporated custom interfaces, viewers and mapping platforms such as ESRI, Google Earth, and Google Maps, which enable users to view the collection, zoom into image detail, or create slide shows, media groups and presentations. Select maps are also featured at the Rumsey Maps island in Second Life as well as 2D and 3D GIS. Designed for laypeople and researchers, the website typically accompanies documents with extensive metadata, such as author, date of publication, full and short title, type, dimensions, notes, area, and publication title. A MapRank search tool enables geographical searching of maps by location and coverage.

== David Rumsey Map Center at Stanford ==
Map of Paris housed at the map center. Atlas topographique des environs de Paris, edited in 1775 by Guillaume Coutans and revised and engraved in 1800 by Charles Picquet.

In February 2009, David Rumsey announced that the entire collection, the largest on the West Coast, would be donated to Stanford University, including 150,000 physical maps and their digital counterparts, as well as the database used to track the images. Stanford houses the collection in the David Rumsey Map Center, which opened in the Green Library in 2016. The collection's website has continued as a separate public resource. The center houses an estimated 250,000 physical maps dating from 1500 to the present and more than 200,000 digital maps, including historical map collections other than Rumsey's.

The San Francisco Chronicle described the center as "a cross between a library and a laboratory," combining physical materials, large displays and over-size, high-definition touchscreens that bridge historical cartographic artifacts and technology, and physical and digital interaction. It is furnished with modular large-exhibition tables that can accommodate some of its most enormous objects, such as an 11-by-17-foot Ōmi Kuni-ezu Japanese Tax map from 1837. The center's exploration tools include georeferencing, 2-D and 3-D platforms, and virtual and augmented reality equipment; these features enable digital overlay of historical maps onto modern maps or satellite views, making it possible to visually compare and assess shifts over time in phenomena such as geography, land use, cultural development and settlement.
