= David Rumsey =

American map collector (born 1944)

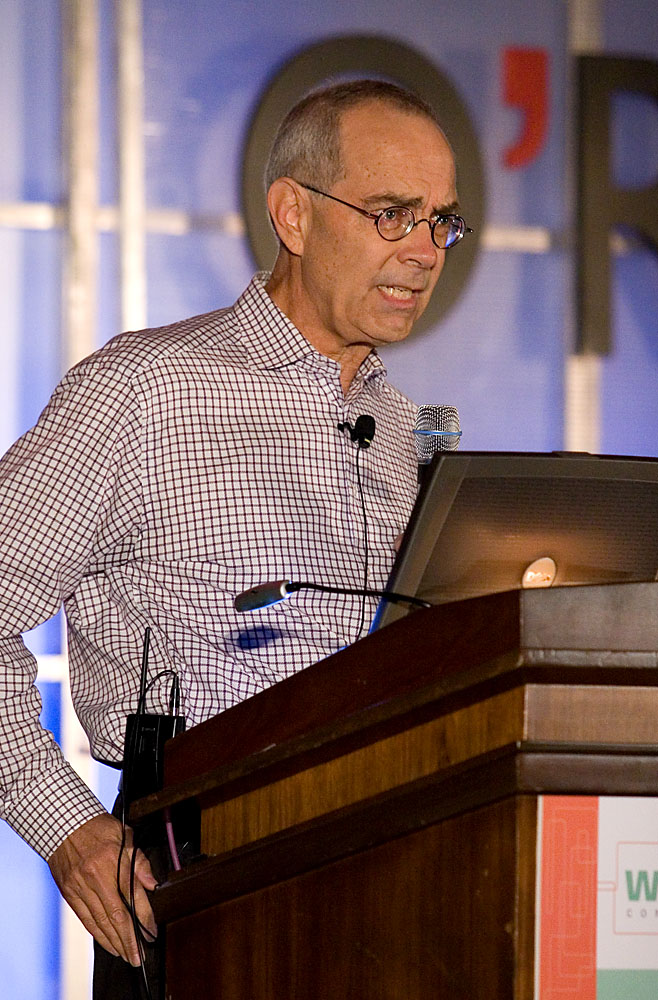
- David Rumsey at the 2005 Where 2.0 Conference
- Born: 1944 (age 81–82); New York City, New York, US
- Education: Yale University
- Known for: David Rumsey Map Collection
- Spouse: Abby Smith Rumsey
- Children: Tessa Rumsey
- Awards: Webby, Special Libraries Association, IMCoS/Helen Wallis
- Website: David Rumsey

David Rumsey (born 1944) is an American map collector, entrepreneur and philanthropist. He assembled one of the world's largest private collections of historical maps, eponymously named and numbering more than 200,000 physical items plus digital materials, which he donated to Stanford University. It is housed at the university's Green Library in the David Rumsey Map Center, which opened in 2016. He began making his collection publicly available in 1997, and is recognized for his contributions to cartographic research and web information systems as an innovator in digitization, archiving, public engagement and data visualization. In 2002, Wired magazine commented, "Rumsey's online map collection introduced a revolutionary, accessible way for people to experience old maps by comparing them to modern geospatial data." Since then his work has integrated map-exploration tools including 2-D and 3-D overlays and virtual and augmented reality equipment.

Rumsey is the president of Cartography Associates, a digital publisher of maps and art, and a former real estate developer and arts professional. He is based in San Francisco.

== Education and art career ==
Rumsey trained in art at Yale University, studying photography with Walker Evans and earning BA and MFA degrees. In 1966, he was an initiate into the Skull and Bones society. Rumsey was a founding member of Yale Research Associates in the Arts (also known as Pulsa), an artist collective that explored immersive public art, communal living and utopian ideas. The group's work was multidisciplinary, involving electronic engineering, computer science, architecture, psychology, mathematics, and art, with a focus on systems and interactivity. Its experimental light and sound environments were designed to integrate technology into the arts and to resist the commercial impulses of the art market. During its years of activity (1966–73), Pulsa created installations at the Museum of Modern Art, Boston Public Gardens, Walker Art Center, and Cal Arts, among other venues. Its spatial, cross-disciplinary and democratic approach would influence Rumsey's later work with maps.

During the Pulsa period, Rumsey lectured in art at Yale before relocating to San Francisco in 1973 to become associate director of the American Society for Eastern Arts. In 1975, he shifted career direction to real estate development. While no longer his primary focus, he continued to produce art, including photo-collages described as "David Hockney-like," and more Pulsa-oriented works, such as the large-scale installation mounted at Burning Man in 2024 and 2026 titled The Speed of The Earth. A collaboration with Wired magazine founding editor Kevin Kelly, the installation consisted of a one-mile-long line of 30 strobe lights, flashing at the rate of 1,156 feet per second to illustrate the rotational speed of the earth at the latitude of the site.

== Real estate and finance career ==
Rumsey worked in real estate development and finance for two decades. He became a founding member of General Atlantic Holding Company, the New York-based growth-equity firm created in 1980 by billionaire Chuck Feeney, co-founder of Duty Free Shoppers. Rumsey served as president and director of several of the company's real estate subsidiaries, negotiating property deals in New York and San Francisco, among other roles. General Atlantic was designed by Feeney to generate wealth for humanitarian purposes; it later became The Atlantic Philanthropies, one of the world's largest charitable foundations, through which Feeney ultimately disbursed his fortune. His influential commitment to high-impact "giving while living" had a significant influence on Rumsey's own philanthropic efforts after he retired from real estate in 1995.

== Map collection and web activities ==
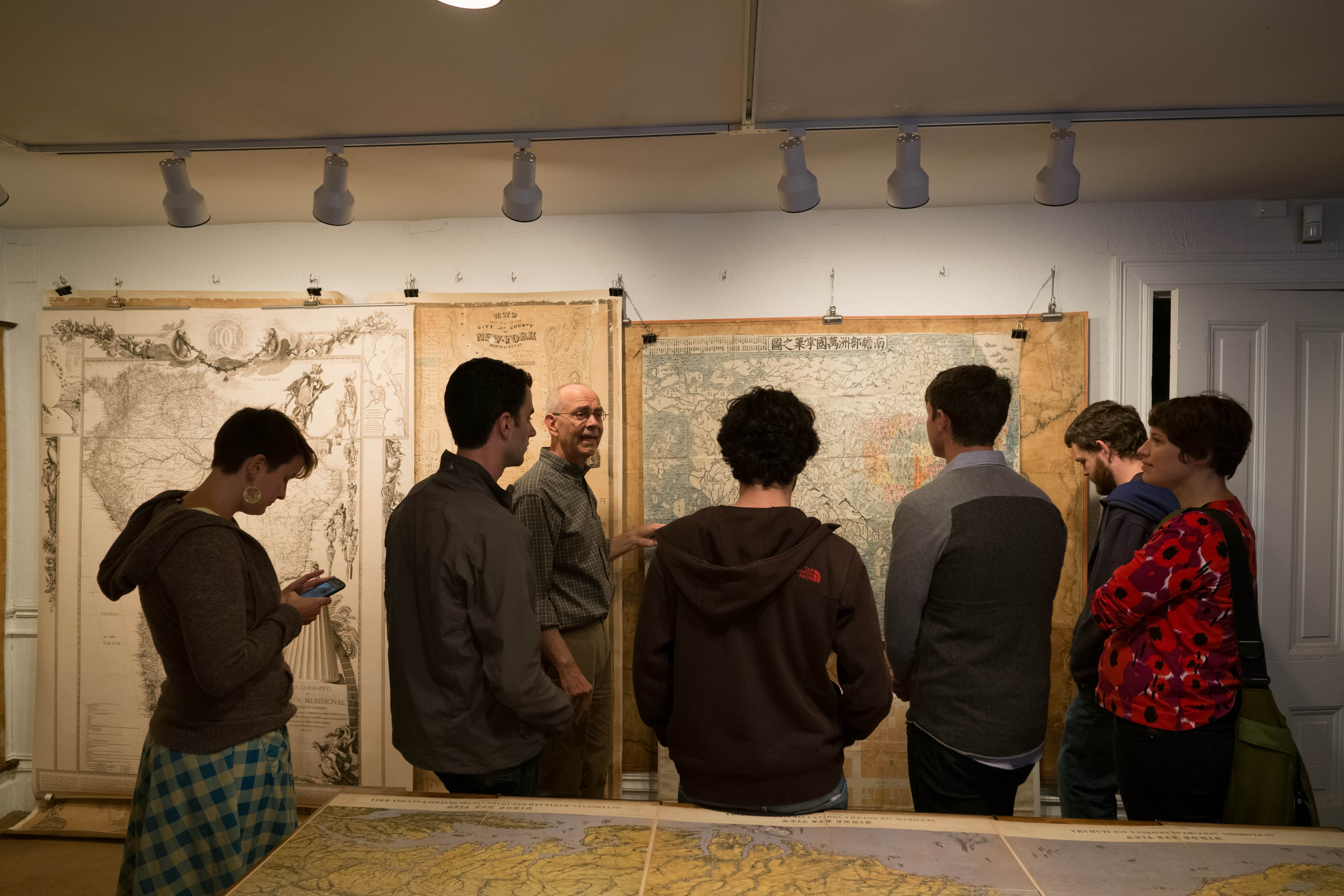
David Rumsey giving a guided tour of his collection.

Rumsey was drawn to maps from an early age, an interest later furthered by his background in art and real estate development. He began collecting maps in the early 1980s and amassed more than 200,000 of them from the 16th to the 21st century, spanning the history of mapmaking across the entire globe. He bought his first item in a rare book store in San Francisco—a small, hand-colored school atlas from 1839 that documented the secession of Texas from Mexico by showing it as a separate country. His early collecting focused on North and South America between 1700 and 1900, centuries that saw the rise of modern cartography.

The collection includes individual flat, rolled and pocket maps, atlases, globes, maritime and celestial charts, school geographies, wooden puzzle maps, and books of cartography, travel and exploration. It has supported and spurred historical research, interactive exhibits (e.g., at the San Francisco International Airport, Bruce Museum, and online), and collaborative projects with the Library of Congress, National Library of Scotland, and Digital Public Library of America, among others.

After leaving real estate, Rumsey devoted his efforts more fully to the map collection, including cataloguing, documenting and—with the advent of digital technology and the internet—making it available for free viewing. He began digitizing the collection in 1997. Rather than place it in an institutional archive, however, he launched a website (www.davidrumsey.com) in 1999 with the intent to provide viewers with an in-person, hands-on experience. The project exploited capacity for great detail and mobility, using tools such as advanced software, high-resolution scanning, and robust compression and search engine technologies. He collaborated with Luna Imaging, a Los Angeles-based digital-archiving company founded by Michael Ester, a former director of the Getty Art History Information Program. Luna was known in museum and academic research circles for software converting visual material into high-resolution images that could be manipulated at high speeds; in 1999 Rumsey joined the company as its director. Luna's software and viewer allowed users to search, zoom, pan, print and compare historical maps from different years side by side. In addition to his efforts on his own collection, Rumsey and his company, Cartography Associates, have scanned and put online the collections of others, including one of rarely seen and fragile historical maps of Japan held by the East Asian Library at the University of California Berkeley.

In 2001, Rumsey introduced a GIS (geographical information system) browser using visualization software to the website, which allowed users to overlay old maps with current geospatial data, like roads, lakes, parks, aerial photos and satellite imagery. He subsequently incorporated custom interfaces and mapping platforms, including ESRI, Google Earth, Google Maps and Second Life, to enhance the website's experience. The interactive section of the site provides GIS-based software that, for example, enables users fly through 3-D maps of Yosemite National Park, San Francisco, and other locales.

In 2009, Rumsey announced the intention to donate his entire collection to Stanford University; it was marked in April 2016 by the opening of the David Rumsey Map Center in the school's Green Library. The center houses an estimated 250,000 physical maps and more than 200,000 digital maps from 1500 to the present. The San Francisco Chronicle described it as "a cross between a library and a laboratory … an arena for experimentation and education" where both laypeople and scholars can explore primary documents and their scanned, digital counterparts. Its physical materials, large-display capability and over-size, high-definition touchscreens bridge historical cartographic artifacts and technological advancement. Visitors can explore georeferencing, 2-D and 3-D platforms, and virtual and augmented reality equipment, which, for example, allow the digital overlay of historical maps onto modern maps or satellite views; by adjusting the transparency, visual comparisons across time can be made in terms of cultural development, land use and settlement.

== Research and service ==
Rumsey has lectured widely on his online library work, at international conferences and venues including the Digital Library Federation, Library of Congress, New York Public Library, O'Reilly Open Source Convention, Harvard University, Stanford University, and Where 2.0. He is the co-author (with Edith M. Punt) of Cartographica Extraordinaire: The Historical Map Transformed (2004), a book and atlas drawing from his map collection, which connects historical cartography and narrative, exploration, information design and new technologies such as GIS. He contributed the chapter "Historical Maps in GIS", co-written with Meredith Williams, to the collection Past Time, Past Place: GIS for History (2002).

Rumsey has served as a board member for institutions including the American Antiquarian Society, Council on Library and Information Resources (CLIR), Internet Archive, John Carter Brown Library, The Long Now Foundation, Samuel H. Kress Foundation, Stanford University Library, and Yale Library Associates.

== Recognition ==
In 2002, Rumsey received an honors award from the Special Libraries Association for making his map collection publicly available. His website has won various web awards, including the 2002 International Academy of Digital Arts and Sciences Webby Award for technical achievement. In 2012 he was recognized by the Stanford University Libraries with its Warren R. Howell Award for service to the university. He received the IMCoS (International Map Collectors Society)/Helen Wallis Award for cartographic contributions of merit in 2026.

In 2023, a documentary reflecting upon Rumsey's life and collecting, memory, mortality and change, A Stranger Quest, premiered at the Torino Film Festival. Directed by Andrea Gatopoulos, the film screened at more than twenty film festivals, including the Vancouver International Film Festival, and received a Special Jury Prize at the DokuBaku International Documentary Film Festival in 2024.

== Personal life ==
Rumsey was born in 1944 and raised in New York City. He lives in San Francisco with his wife, historian and author Abby Smith Rumsey. Their daughter is the poet, Tessa Rumsey. David Rumsey is the great-grandson of William Rumsey, a lawyer, New York Supreme Court judge and American Civil War soldier, and is the great, great-grandson of David Rumsey, a New York congressman.

== See also ==
- Geographic information system (GIS)
- Cartography
