= Map Room =

Map Room may refer to:

- A room for storing a large map collection
- Map Room (White House), a ground floor sitting room that once served as a situation room during World War II
- One of the rooms of the Churchill War Rooms, a hub of the war effort in World War II
- The Map Room of The British Museum, which later became the Map Library
- Navigation station, the area of a ship's bridge where nautical charts are kept
