= Mapoteca Manuel Orozco y Berra =

Map library in Mexico City

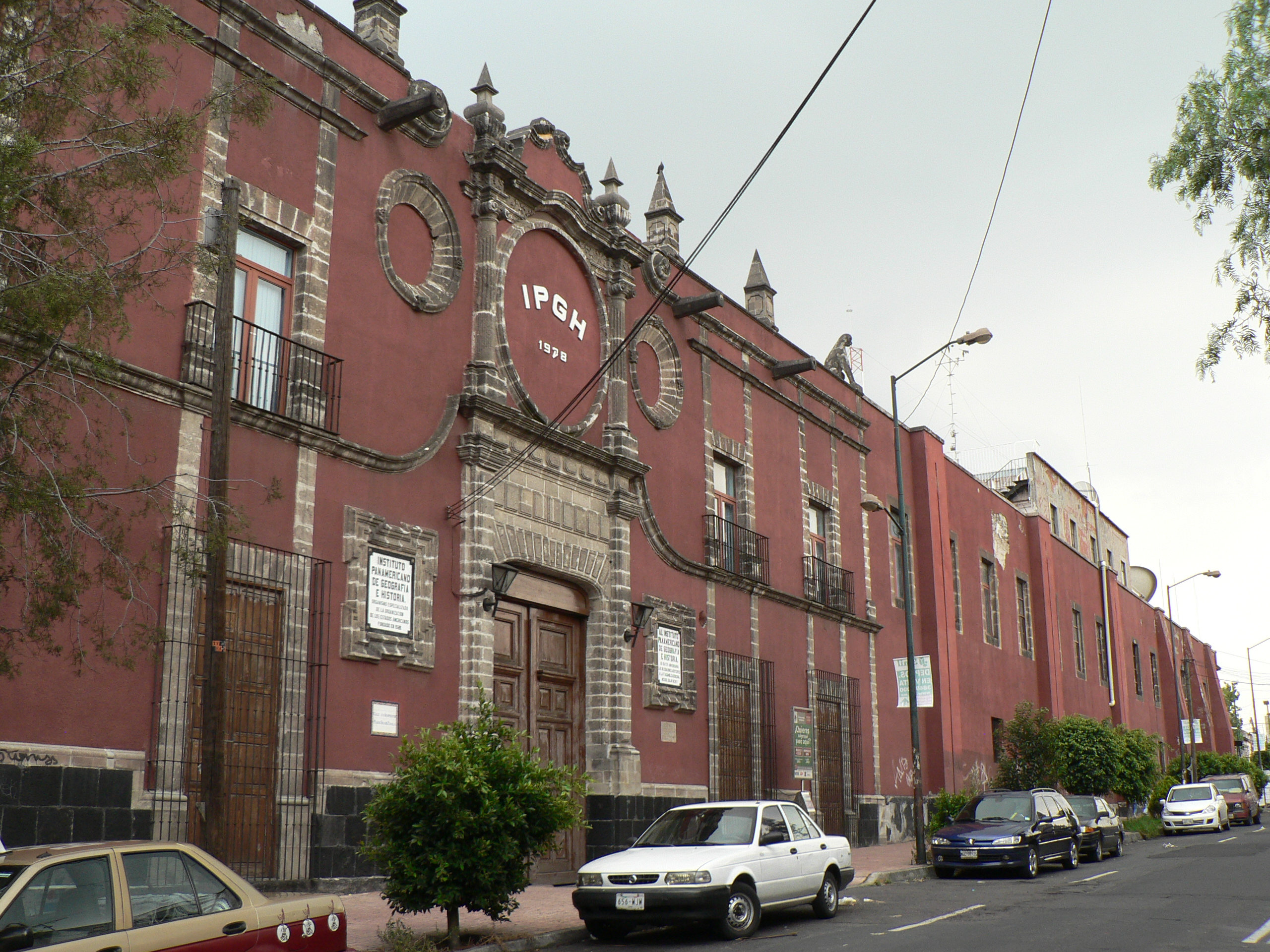
- The former Archbishop's Palace of Tacubaya, which houses the map library
- Location: Tacubaya, Miguel Hidalgo, Mexico City, Av. Observatorio 192, Col. Observatorio, C.P. 11860, Mexico
- Type: Map library
- Established: 1877 (as the cartographic archive of the Ministry of Development); 1977 (current name)

Collection
- Items collected: Maps, atlases, field notebooks, technical reports, aerial photographs, surveying instruments
- Size: More than 100,000 maps; over 150,000 items in total (2013)

Access and use
- Access requirements: Free

Other information
- Parent organization: Servicio de Información Agroalimentaria y Pesquera, Secretariat of Agriculture and Rural Development
- Website: gob.mx

The Mapoteca Manuel Orozco y Berra (MMOyB) is a map library in Mexico City which the Mexican government describes as holding the country's largest cartographic collection. Its holdings, which grew out of the cartographic archive of the 19th-century Ministry of Development (Ministerio de Fomento), include more than 100,000 maps and plans, atlases, field notebooks, technical reports and historical surveying instruments. It is named after the historian and geographer Manuel Orozco y Berra, whose map collection is among its oldest holdings. The library is run by the Servicio de Información Agroalimentaria y Pesquera (SIAP, Agrifood and Fisheries Information Service) of the Secretariat of Agriculture and Rural Development and occupies part of the former Archbishop's Palace in Tacubaya.

== History ==
=== Fomento cartographic archive ===
The library traces its origin to the Cartographic Department of the Ministry of Development, set up in 1877 to gather the maps and studies the government needed for economic planning and for managing natural resources and land. SIAP credits the minister Vicente Riva Palacio and Porfirio Díaz with backing its creation.

Manuel Orozco y Berra (1816–1881), a surveying engineer who served as oficial mayor (chief administrative officer) of the Ministry of Development, had assembled a private collection of more than 3,000 maps. He cataloged it with the help of his wife and published the catalog in 1871 as Materiales para una cartografía mexicana, arranging the maps from general and early maps to those of individual states and then by subject. The collection, 3,445 documents according to Hernández Ortiz, passed to the ministry around the time of his death in 1881. (Note: Hernández Ortiz says Orozco y Berra donated the collection before he died; Mendoza Vargas says it was donated after his death.) Besides maps, it included copies of codices, navigation charts, military, topographic and hydrological maps, and architectural plans.

=== Expansion and naming ===
Later offices of the Secretariat of Agriculture added to the collection, among them the Dirección de Estudios Geográficos y Climatológicos (1917) and the Dirección de Geografía y Meteorología (1953). Researchers also donated their own collections, among them those of Domingo Diez (75 maps), Pastor Rouaix (580 maps) and Amado Aguirre (68 maps).

In December 1977, the centenary of the cartographic archive, the library was officially named after Orozco y Berra at the initiative of Captain Silvino Aguilar Anguiano. The same year the Pan American Institute of Geography and History, which shares the building, transferred its cartographic collection of some 58,000 documents to the library.

=== Renovation and digitization ===
The library reopened to the public after a renovation in 2010; at the ceremony Agriculture Secretary Francisco Mayorga Castañeda handed representatives of public agencies original maps and photographs from the work of the Mexican boundary commission with Guatemala. In 2013 the library began contributing digitized maps to the Biblioteca Digital Mexicana; the first two were José María Narváez's Carta geográfica de una gran parte de la América Septentrional (1832) and a plan of the provinces of Sinaloa, Sonora and part of California prepared by José Antonio de Alzate y Ramírez. In 2012 SIAP published a new edition of Orozco y Berra's 1871 catalog. Part of the collection is also available on Memórica.

As of October 2026, the library's online catalog stated that the library was closed for maintenance until further notice and that its digital collections were suspended.

== Collections ==
In 1995 the library held more than 100,000 maps and plans, organized by collection and region, along with about 250 historical and geographic atlases, 400 boxes of topographic field reports, more than 600 notebooks of geodetic and astronomical observations, and a collection of historical surveying instruments, part of which is on display. Its technical archive of about 5,000 files and field notebooks, dating from 1860 to 1970, covers topography, astronomy, geodesy and gravimetry. Counting maps, instruments and archival files, SIAP put the total at more than 150,000 items in 2013. The oldest maps date from the 17th century.

Its main collections include those of Orozco y Berra, the Pan American Institute of Geography and History, the General Collection of the Ministry of Development, a historical collection and maps from INEGI. Special collections include:

- the general map of Mexico produced by the Comisión Geográfico-Exploradora (1877–1914), a military survey commission headed by the engineer Agustín Díaz
- the maps of the international boundary with the United States (1848–1856)
- the maps of the boundary with Guatemala (1879–1899), along with photographs of the survey crews and boundary markers

The library also holds 19th-century architectural plans for public buildings, prisons, lighthouses, hospitals, railway stations and exhibition pavilions. They include plans by Maximilian's architects for remodeling Chapultepec Castle and the National Palace, which, according to México Desconocido, survive only in this collection. Among its photographic holdings is a copy, unique in Mexico, of Désiré Charnay's album Cités et ruines américaines, with 49 large-format original prints. These are among the oldest surviving photographs of Mexican archaeology. A catalog of aerial photographs and historical instruments such as theodolites, sextants and compasses was opened to the public for the first time in 2010.

== Building ==
The library occupies rooms around the second courtyard of the former Archbishop's Palace (Palacio Arzobispal) of Tacubaya. The palace was built between 1734 and 1738 for Archbishop Juan Antonio de Vizarrón y Eguiarreta as a country residence for the archbishops of Mexico. After it became national property around 1847, presidents including Santa Anna and Comonfort stayed there, and troops under Winfield Scott occupied it in August and September 1847 during the Mexican–American War. From 1868 to 1893 it housed the Heroic Military Academy, and parts were later used by the Mexican Geodetic Commission and the Museum of Natural History. The part of the complex used by the National Astronomical Observatory was demolished in 1963 to make way for campus 4 of the Escuela Nacional Preparatoria. The building also houses the National Meteorological Service and the Pan American Institute of Geography and History.

Admission is free. Besides reading-room consultation, the library offers guided visits, exhibition loans and certified copies of its documents.

== Gallery ==
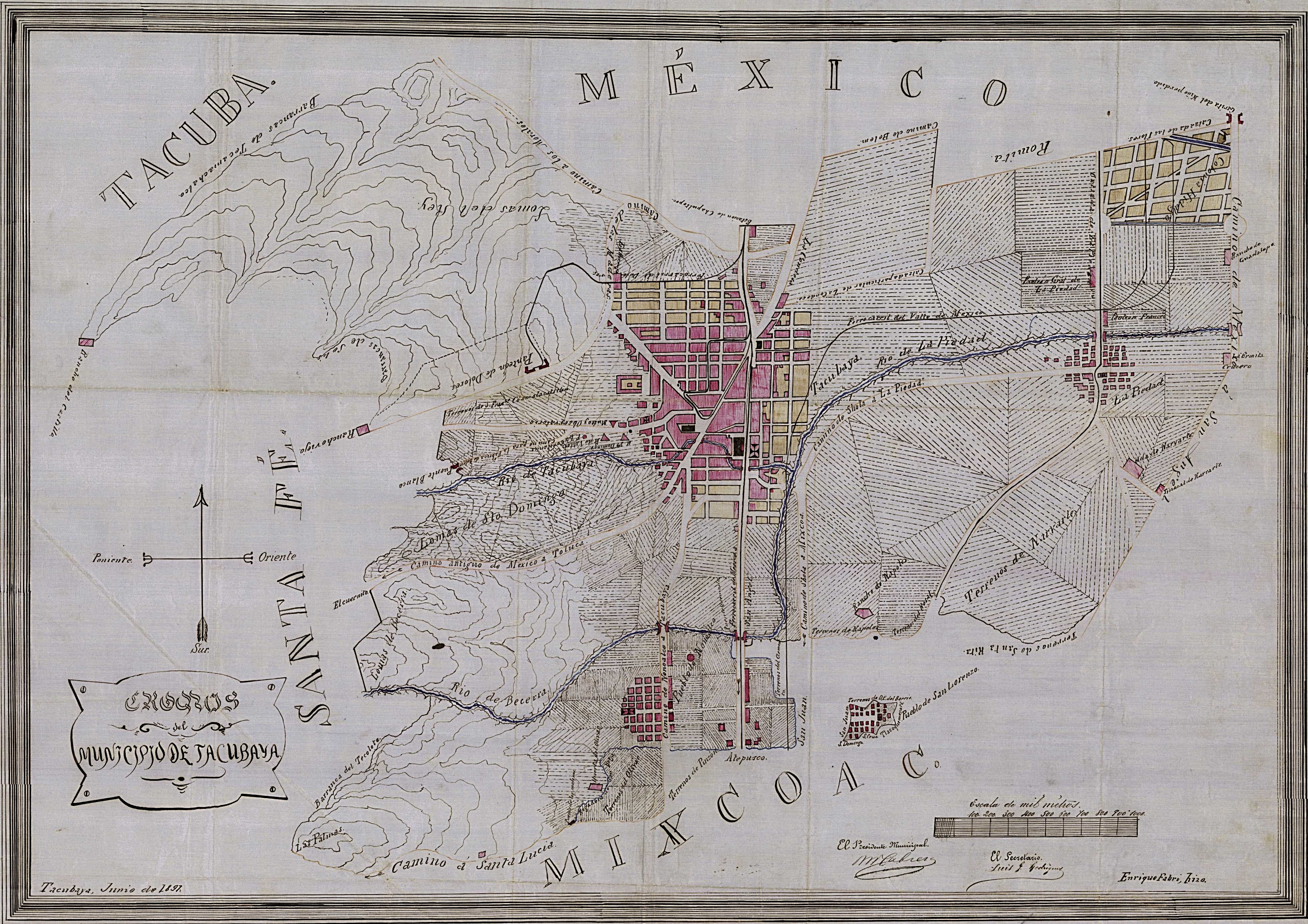
Municipality of Tacubaya (1897)

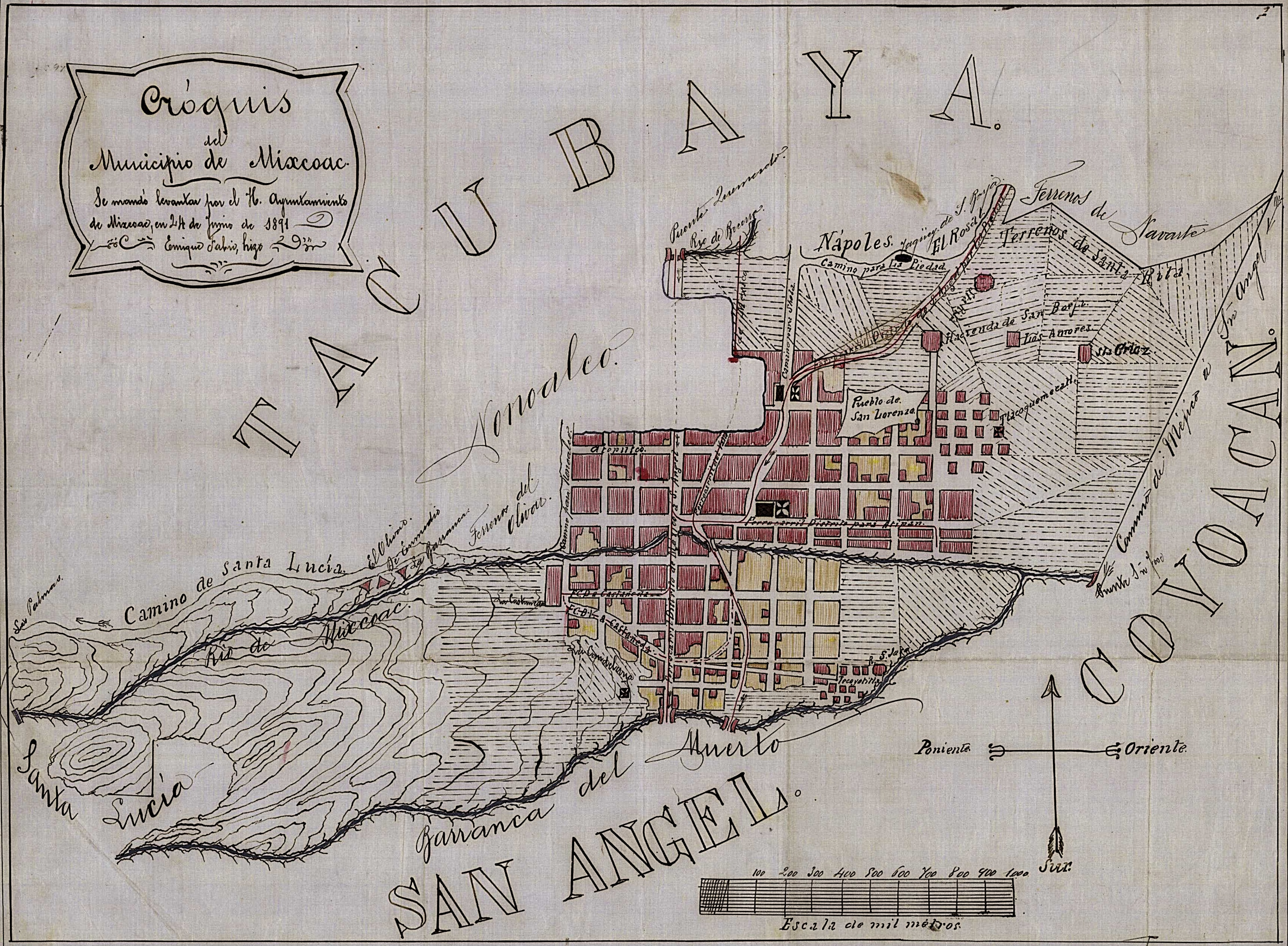
Municipality of Mixcoac (1891)

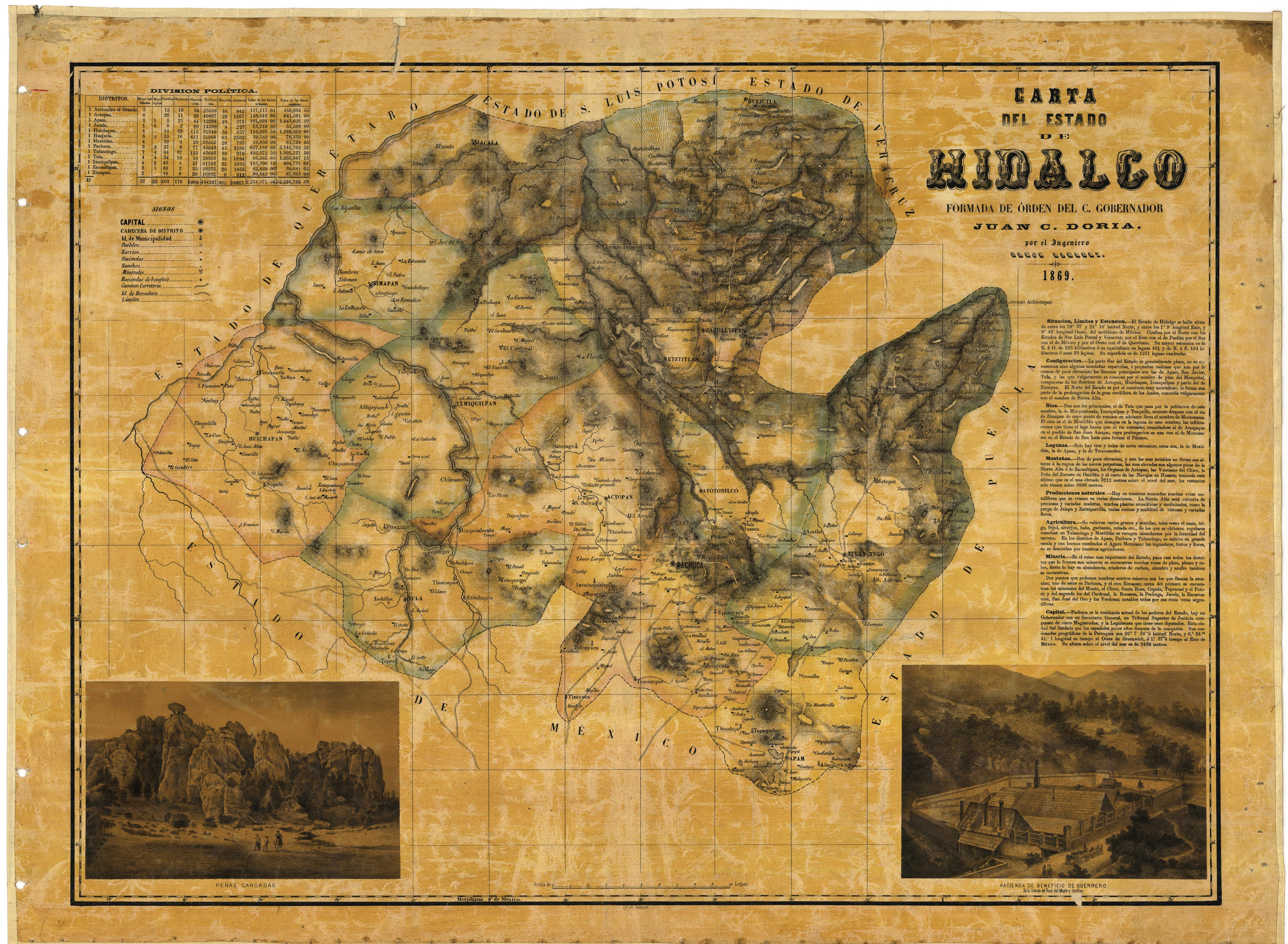
First map of the State of Hidalgo, by Ramón Almaraz (1869)

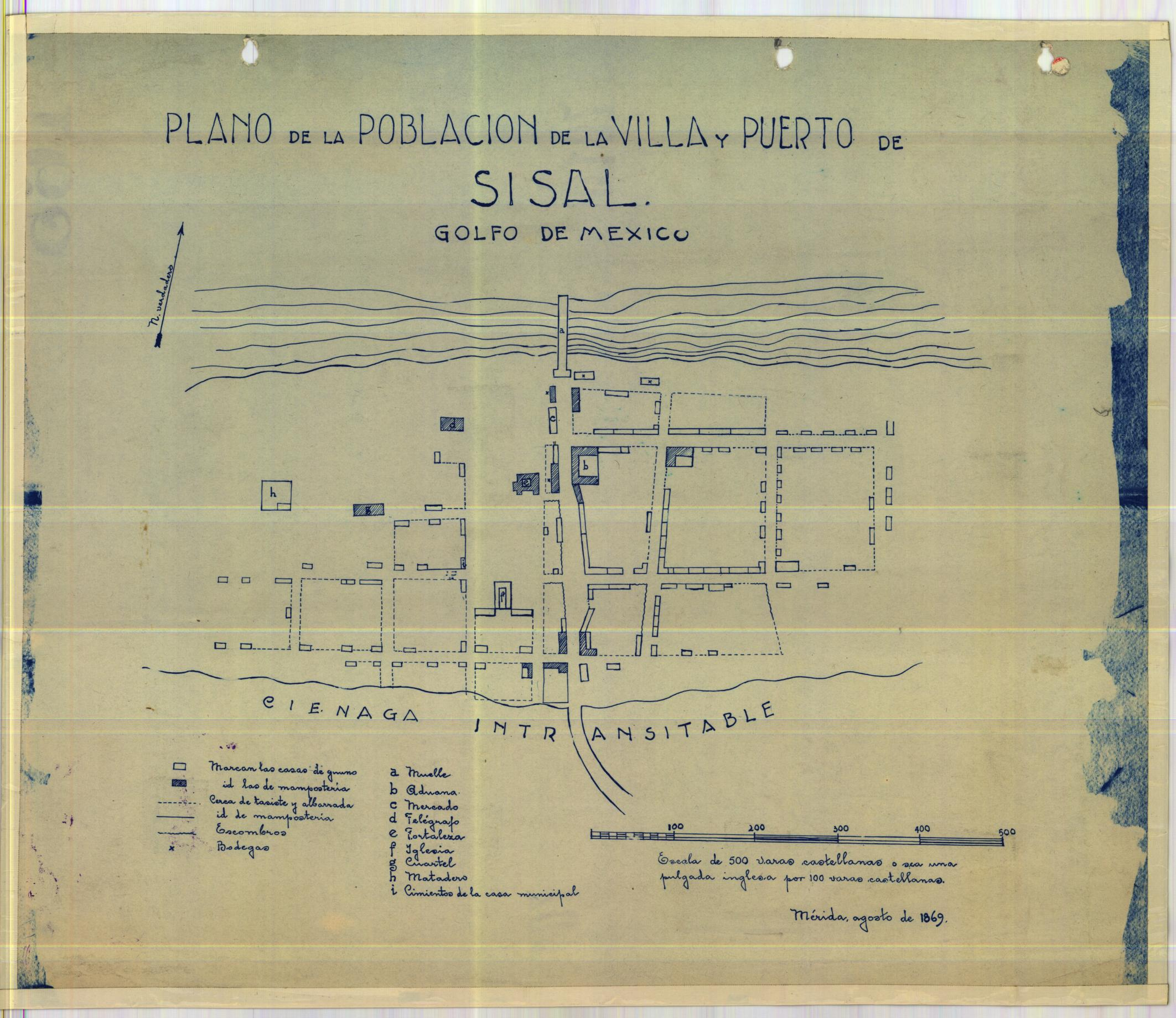
Plan of Sisal (1869)

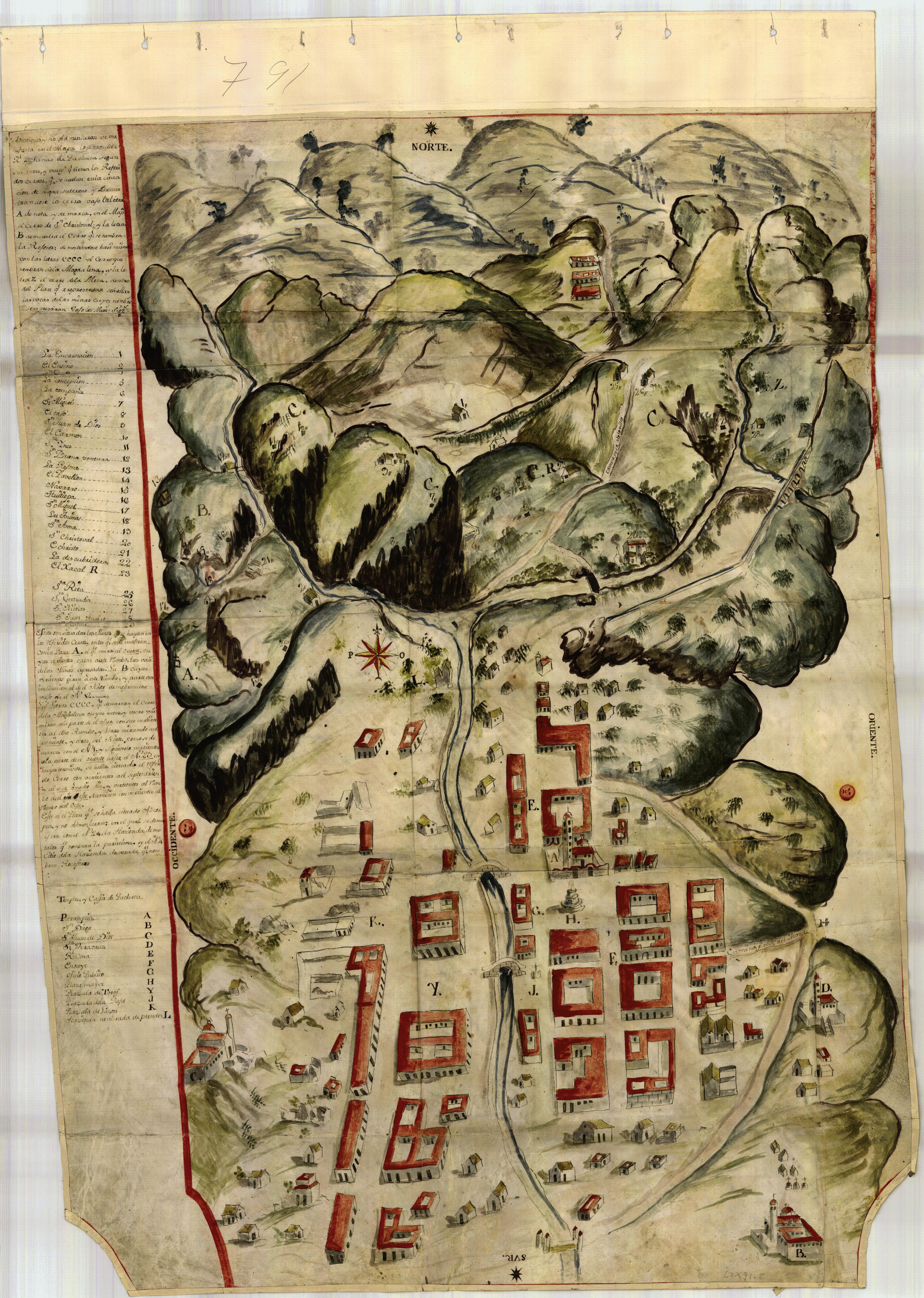
Manuscript map of the mining district of Pachuca (c. 1750)
