= John Alsop Paine =

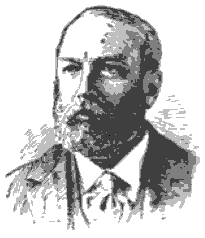
- Born: January 14, 1840; Newark, New Jersey
- Died: July 24, 1912 (aged 72); Tarrytown, New York
- Scientific career
- Fields: Botany
- Author abbrev. (botany): Paine

John Alsop Paine, Jr. (January 14, 1840 – July 24, 1912) was a Presbyterian minister, botanist, cartographer, professor of natural history and German, archaeologist, and editor.

He graduated in 1859 from Hamilton College with B.A. and in 1862 from Andover Seminary with M.Div. From 1862 to 1865 he lived in Utica, New York and worked as a botanist for the board of regents of the University of the State of New York. From 1865 to 1866 he studied at the Sheffield Scientific School of Yale University and at the Columbia School of Mines. In 1867 he was ordained a Presbyterian minister at Andover Seminary. After his ordination, from 1867 to 1869 he was a professor of natural science at the Christian missionary institution Robert College in Istanbul. From 1869 to 1870 he studied at the University of Halle and at Leipzig University.

Paine was a cartographer — drawing the maps for Adams Synchronological Chart or Map of History, published in 1871.

From 1870 to 1871 Paine taught natural history and German at Lake Forest University in Illinois. From 1871 to 1872 he was an associate editor for The Independent. From 1872 to 1874 he was an archaeologist and naturalist with the American Palestine Exploration Society working in the Vilayet of Syria in the region immediately to the east of the Jordan River and the Dead Sea. In 1874 he received an honorary doctorate from Hamilton College in recognition of his research in Palestine. He married the widow Emma Sophia Newton née Gillette in Gloversville, New York in October 1877.

From 1882 to 1884 he edited the Journal of Christian Philosophy in New York and he was on the editorial staff for the Century Dictionary in 1888. Paine was Curator of Casts with the Metropolitan Museum of Art in New York City (1889-1906) ... A dozen plant specimens collected by Mr. Paine are present in the Putnam Museum herbarium.

Paine published several papers, from 1885 to 1889, in the Journal of the American Oriental Society. He retired from the Metropolitan Museum of Art in February 1906.

Upon his death, at his home in Tarrytown, New York, he was survived by his widow. George Johnson Newton (born 1866) was his stepson. John Alsop Paine, Sr. (1795–1871) was a physician and president of the Essex County Medical Society from 1838 to 1841.

== Selected publications ==
- Catalogue of plants found in Oneida County and vicinity. 1865.
- Adams Synchronological Chart or Map of History. 1871.
