= Richard Jarman =

Australian artist (1807–1877)

Richard Jarman (born 1807, London, England – died 1877, Hobart, Tasmania, Australia) was an artist, map-maker, and engraver who was active in London prior to 1857 and in Tasmania between 1857 and the 1870s.

== Career in England ==
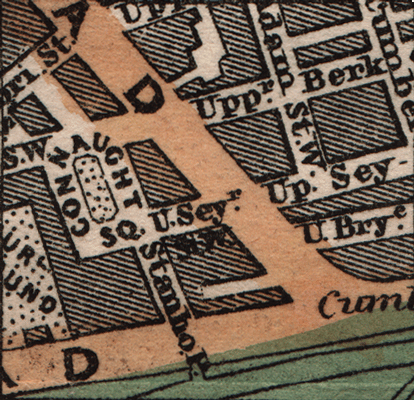
Detail from Reynolds Map of Modern London, 1857, drawn by Jarman

Jarman was born in 1807 in Whitechapel, in London's East End, the son of Robert Jarman, a carpenter, and Amelia Dede. He married Ann Bouchier (or Busher) in 1830. By the 1850s, Jarman had become a successful London map-maker and engraver working from premises in St. Bartholomew's Close in the City of London. His most significant work during this time was The Collins' Illustrated Atlas of London published in 1854 and described by Prof. H. J. Dyos in his introduction to the 1973 re-publication as the first pocket city map of London. Another surviving map drawn by Jarman is Reynolds Map of Modern London published in 1857.

== Career in Tasmania ==
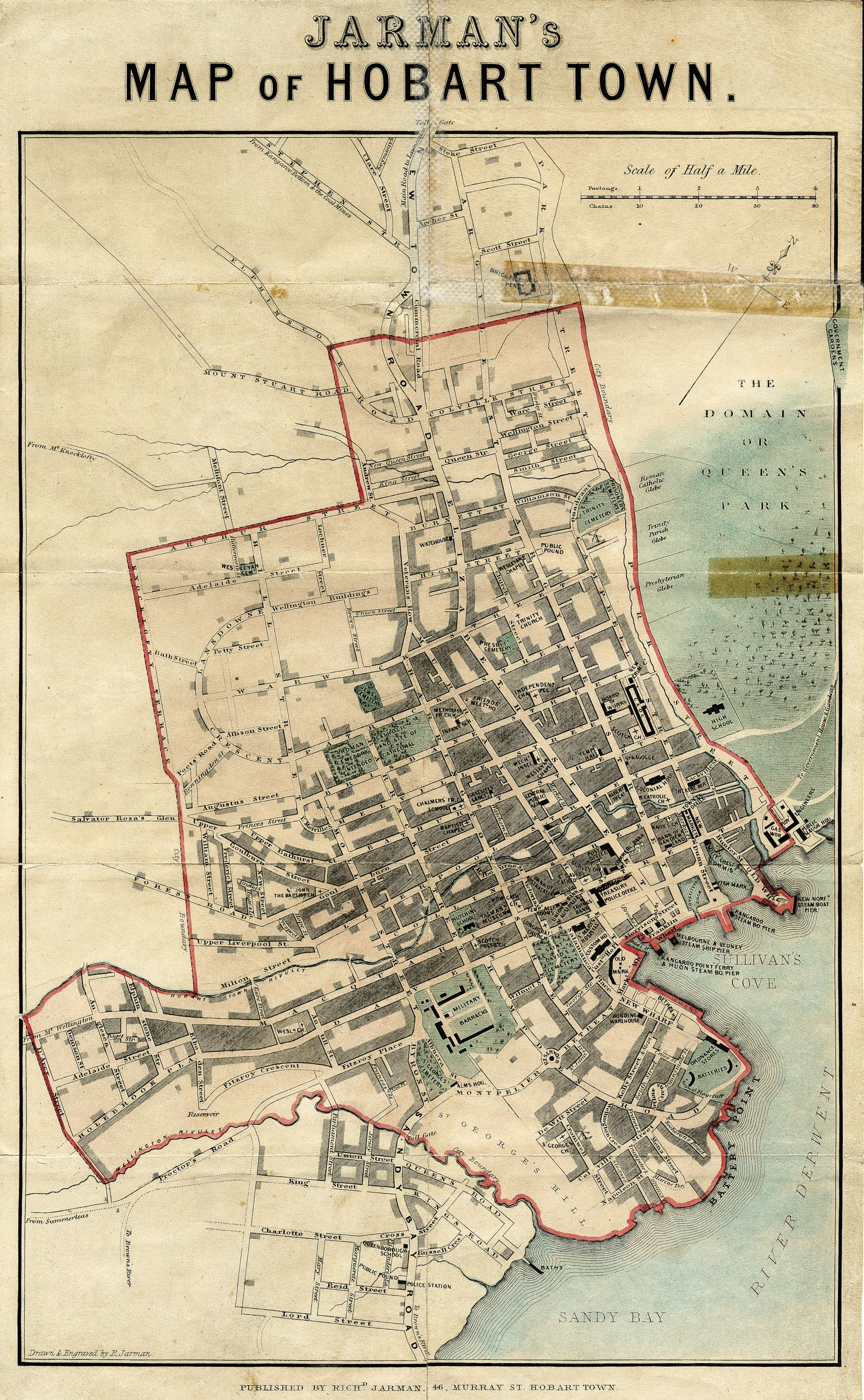
Richard Jarman's map of Hobart Town, 1858

In 1857, he emigrated to Tasmania with his wife and children. There, he drew one of the earliest maps of Hobart Town and became known for his engraved views of Hobart, the original coat of arms of the city, and Crown seals and bank cheques for the Post Office. He also made plates for commercial advertisements. In 1866 Jarman won a special award at the Melbourne Inter-Colonial Exhibition for his copper-plate and steel engravings.

For most of his years in Tasmania he worked from his premises at 46 Murray Street, Hobart. However, by the time of his death on 12 May 1877 he had moved to Forest Road, Hobart.

== Family ==
His sons, Owen, Alfred and Edwin, followed him into map-making and engraving. Owen Jarman was in business as a commercial engraver in Launceston, Tasmania in the 1890s. Alfred Jarman moved to Christchurch, New Zealand and became a map draughtsman and surveyor in the New Zealand Lands Department. Edwin Jarman, who had not emigrated to Tasmania with his father, left England for Cape Town, South Africa in 1861 where he established himself as an engraver.
