= Map collection =

Map storage unit

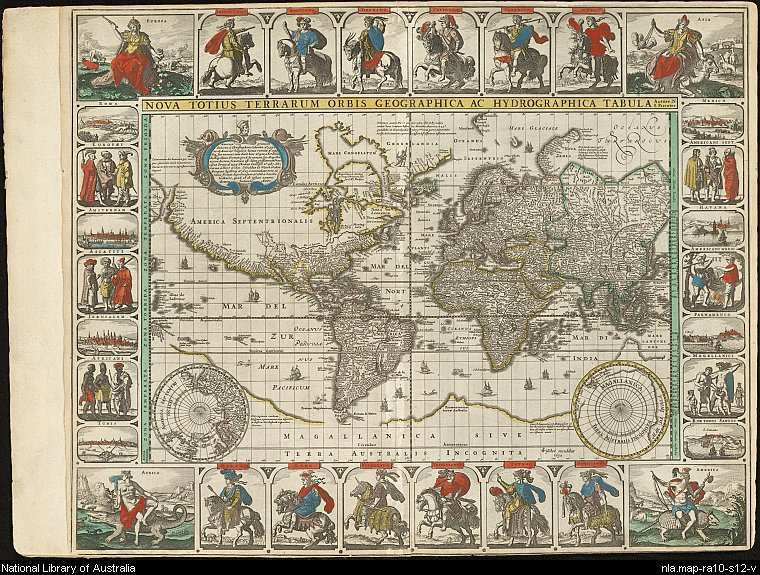
Visscher, Cl.J., World Map. 1652., in Doncker, Hendrick, Sea Atlas (1659 ed.), from the map collection of the National Library of Australia.

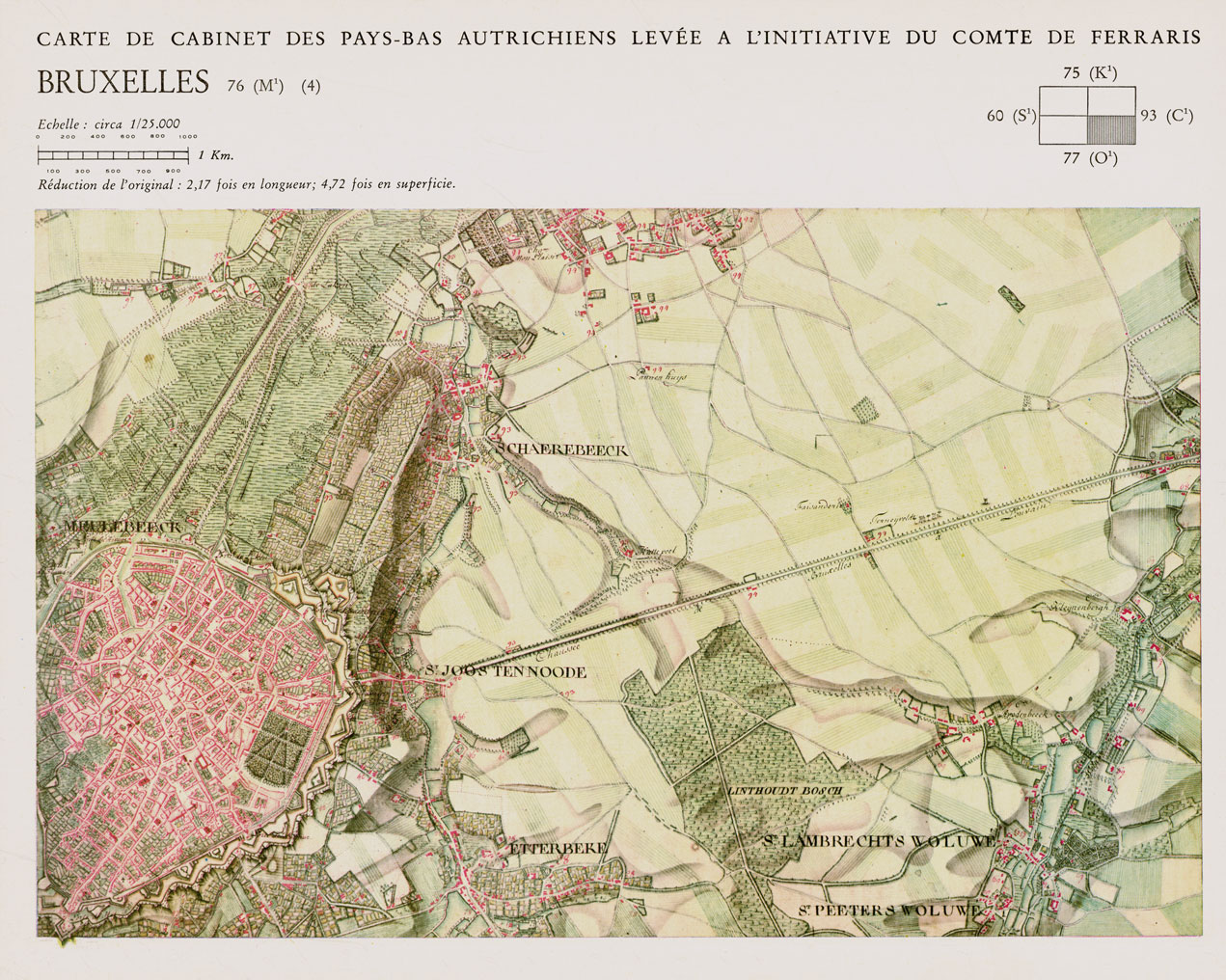
Ferraris map of Brussels, Belgium, between 1771 and 1778, from the map collection of the Royal Library of Belgium.

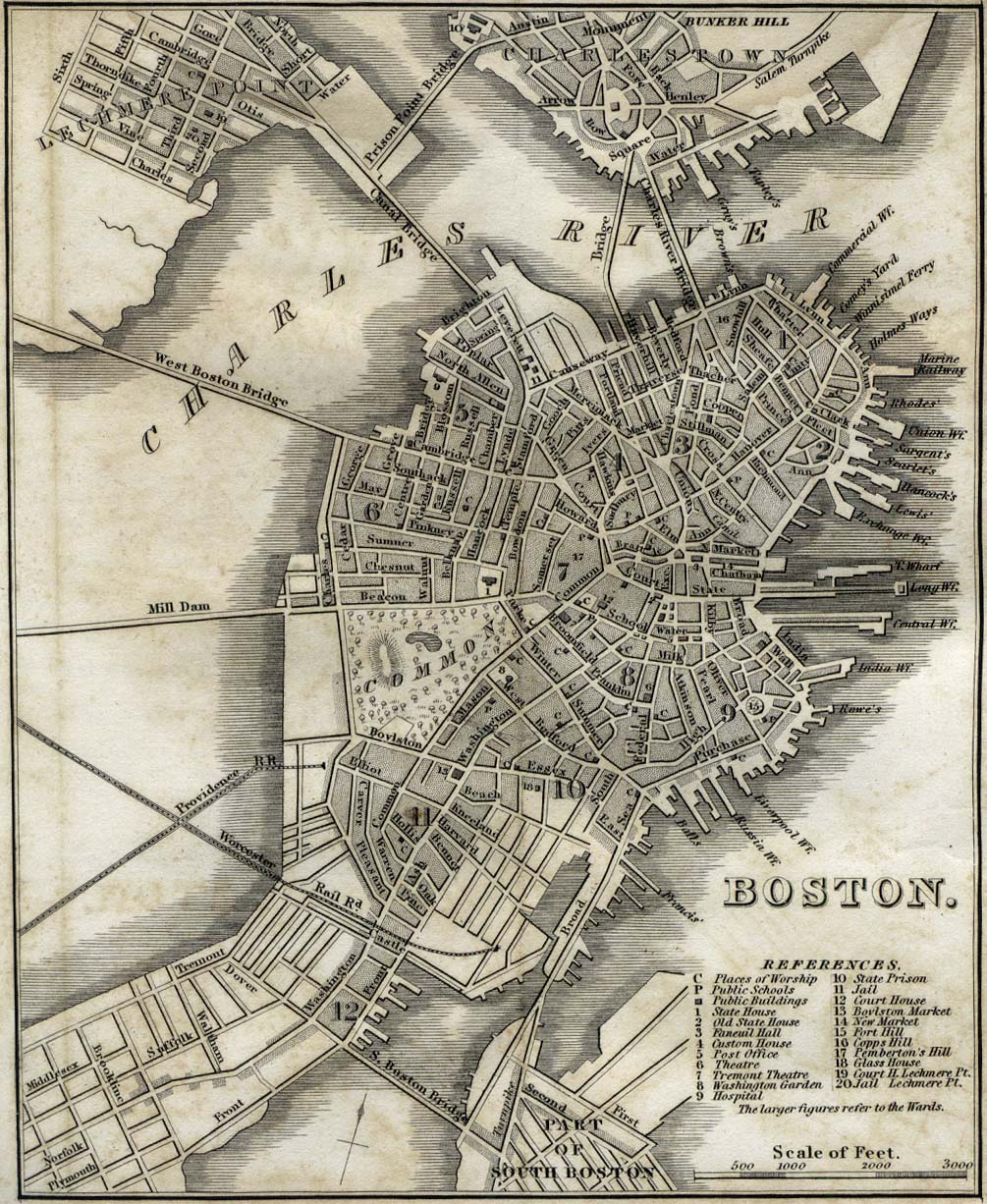
Boston, Massachusetts in 1842, from the Perry–Castañeda Library Map Collection, at the University of Texas at Austin.

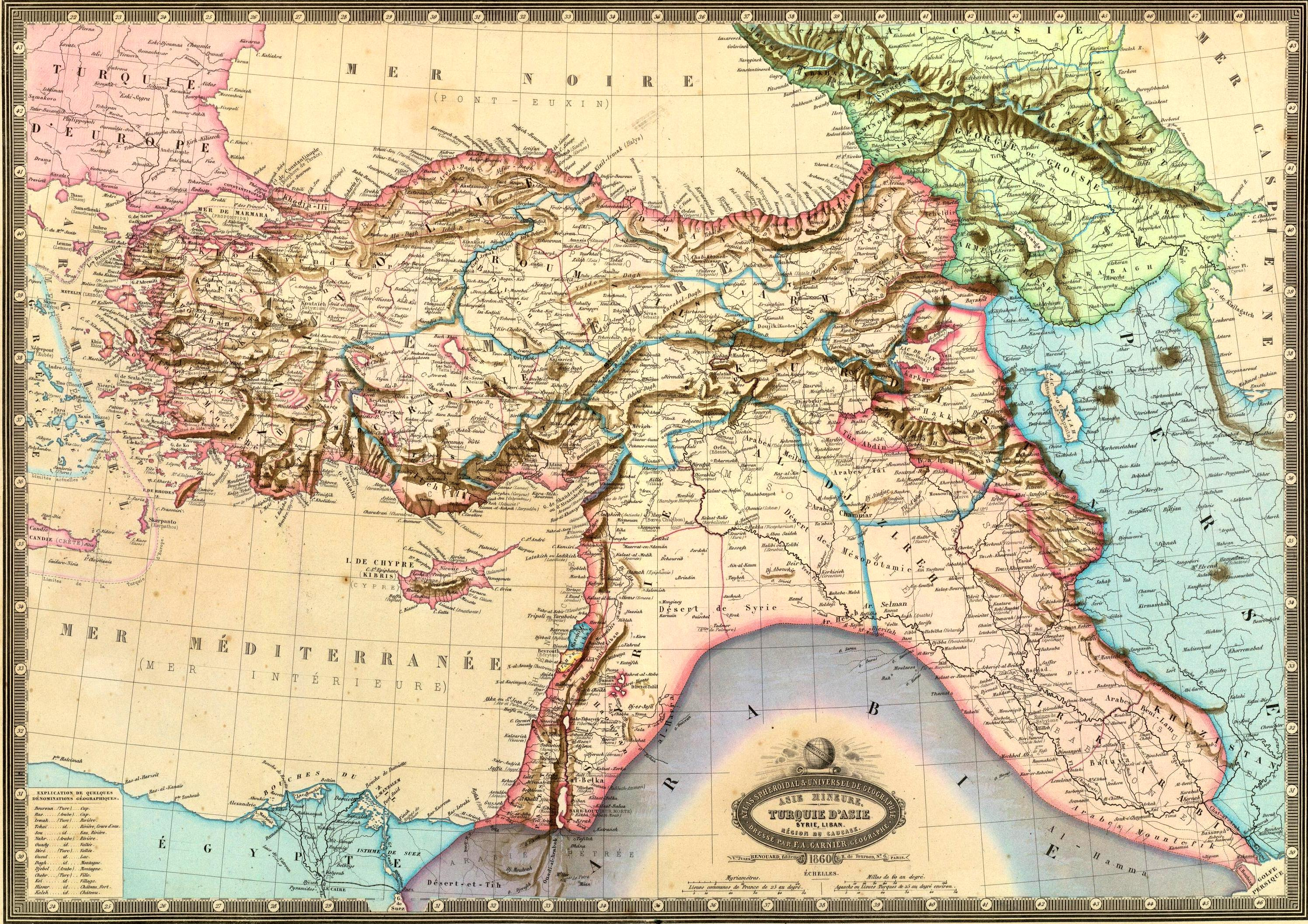
Garnier, F. A., Turquie, Syrie, Liban, Caucase. 1862., from the David Rumsey Map Collection.

A map collection or map library is a storage facility for maps, usually in a library, archive, or museum, or at a map publisher or public-benefit corporation, and the maps and other cartographic items stored within that facility.

Sometimes, map collections are combined with graphic sheets, manuscripts and rare prints in a single department. In such cases, the expression "map collection" refers to the whole of the cartographic collection holdings.

== History ==
Even in medieval libraries, maps formed part of the inventories. According to scholars of the renaissance, maps were collected from the 15th century, either at the court or at naval academies to prepare for voyages of discovery. Over time, new techniques, such as copper engraving, reduced production costs, and assisted in spreading maps more widely.

By the 17th century, private map collections were often the basis for public map collections. As early as 1571, for example, the Court Library in Munich, Bavaria, (now the Bavarian State Library) became the owner of the Fugger collection. In 1823, the British Museum in London acquired the King's Library, which had been inherited and greatly enlarged by George III of the United Kingdom, and donated to the Museum by his heir, George IV of the United Kingdom. The King's Library included a collection of approximately 50,000 maps, plans and views, which are now housed at the British Library and known as the King's Topographical Collection.

In the development of public map collections, the geographical societies were important. They exerted great influence on the establishment and collection policy of such collections, or even stored their own collections at such institutions. So, for example, in 1680 Vincenzo Coronelli founded the Accademia Cosmographicae degli Argonauti, which existed until 1718. In Nuremberg, the Kosmographische Gesellschaft was established in 1740, while a namesake organization came into existence in Vienna in 1790. The Société de Géographie de Paris, founded in 1821, was the first modern geographic society.

Especially in the 19th century, many map collections were either newly established, or merged with existing collections of cartographic materials held by libraries under the responsibility of specialist librarians.

== Collection types and development ==
- In academic libraries, map collections usually have a stock of old maps and atlases. Often such libraries also acquire new copies of various official topographic map series, individual thematic maps, national atlases and thematic regional atlases. Academic library map collections usually also have cartographic literature.
- National libraries collect all the maps that fall within their territory and are submitted by the publishing houses of that territory in compliance with applicable legal deposit laws.
- General and regional libraries, depending upon their orientation, collect tourist maps and city maps, sometimes linked with travel guides.
- Map publishers and map producing agencies (for example, Survey Offices) archive their own map production. These collections are in some cases not open to the public.
- Private collections are often set up thematically or regionally, so that private map collectors not uncommonly develop into renowned experts, and authors of map bibliographies, in their specific collection area.
- A collection of globes can be considered as a special type of map collection.

== Documentation ==
Newly published maps, like books, are recorded in national bibliographies. Thus, the title, author(s), imprint and ISBN of any recently published map are mentioned in official records. Additionally, various data specific to a map, such as scale, map projection, geographical coordinates and map format, are included in the records of that map.

Most academic map collection owners now index at least the most important parts of the collection in electronic catalogues that can be viewed online.

Older collections or private collections are often described in bibliophile catalogues. In such catalogues, at least representative parts of the collection are shown. Bibliophile catalogues provide evidence of the collection's stock that can be used in the event of theft. Also, the use of a collection's rarities can thereby be noticeably limited, as in many cases the image and scientific description of the map is sufficient for the required purpose, and thus the original map is left undisturbed.

Holdings in archives are often not indexed on a single sheet by sheet basis, but on a basis under which a sheet can be found in the records only with the assistance of a finding aid. Archive staff, often not trained in cartographic matters, can be cautious in describing an unwieldy, and in some ways reputedly "foreign" document type. For that reason, significant characteristics such as the projection and map scale of an individual sheet will often be omitted from an index to a map collection. These circumstances make it difficult for users of such indexes to search for a specific map in an archive, but still allow persistent researchers to make some 'discoveries'.

== Major map collections ==
=== Overview ===
The authoritative guide World directory of map collections (2000) lists 714 map collections in 121 countries. With few exceptions, the most valuable map collections are held in either Europe or North America. There are also some map collections in South America, Africa and South Asia, but those collections are comparatively rare and of much lower value.

=== Europe ===
==== Austria ====
Indisputably the largest map collection in Austria is the Map Department of the Austrian National Library in Vienna. It has about 275,000 maps, 240,000 geographic-topographic views, 570 globes, 80 reliefs and models of fortresses, and about 75,000 volumes of technical literature and atlases,

Also a department of the Austrian National Library is the world's only public Globe Museum, at the Palais Mollard, Vienna.

==== Belgium ====
The Royal Library of Belgium in Brussels has a collection of over 200,000 maps, atlases, cartographic books and globes. Most of these items relate either to Belgium, or to its former colony the Democratic Republic of Congo.

==== France ====
The Département des cartes et plans of the Bibliothèque nationale de France in Paris ranks among the top three worldwide collections of cartographic materials. It holds stocks of atlases, maps, map series, globes, geography games, city maps, building plans and relief maps.

==== Germany ====
The largest map collections in Germany are those of the Berlin State Library, the Bavarian State Library in Munich and the Göttingen State and University Library.

Not currently publicly available is the collection of the publisher Justus Perthes in Gotha, which is owned by the state of Thuringia and presently housed at the University of Erfurt.

==== Spain ====
The National Library of Spain in Madrid has a collection of over 500,000 maps.

==== Switzerland ====
In Switzerland, there are major map collections in several libraries. The map collection in ETH Zurich's library is the largest, and specialises in thematic maps. The map collection of the Zentralbibliothek Zürich covers to a large extent the various official topographic map series and national atlases.

Located in Bern is the Ryhiner Collection, a former private collection of Johann Friedrich von Ryhiner, with a focus on the 17th and 18th centuries.

==== United Kingdom ====
Major map collections are held at the British Library in London, the National Library of Scotland (available free online), the National Library of Wales and the Bodleian Library at the University of Oxford.

=== North America ===
==== Canada ====
Library and Archives Canada in Ottawa has a collection of some two million cartographic items.

==== United States ====
The world's largest collection of maps is held by the Library of Congress in Washington, D.C. It includes around 5.2 million maps.

David Rumsey Map Center, Stanford University Libraries. Premier cartographic collection on the U.S. west coast contains over 150,000 maps.

The Osher Map Library located on the University of Southern Maine's Portland Campus has a large collection of maps, atlases, and globes.

=== Oceania ===
==== Australia ====
The map collection of the National Library of Australia in Canberra includes over 600,000 maps and 2,500 atlases.

== Challenges ahead ==
As with books in libraries, map collections now put more weight on creation of digital documents. These include maps and atlases on CD-ROM and DVD and in some cases the provision of Geodata. Such new forms of publication present map collections with major problems, as not just "mere" text and some inline images need to be kept, but very large amounts of data, up to several Gigabytes, that may eventually be required to operate specialised geographic information systems.

Also, the long-term storage of cartographic data is an unresolved issue that is particularly important for archives.

The digitization of analogue map stocks also offers the opportunity to link library catalogues directly with the images (or at least with so-called thumbnails). Also, digitally processed sheet indexes to individual sheets of map series allow for more targeted research from one's own workplace.
