= Adams Synchronological Chart or Map of History =

1871 chart by Sebastian C. Adams

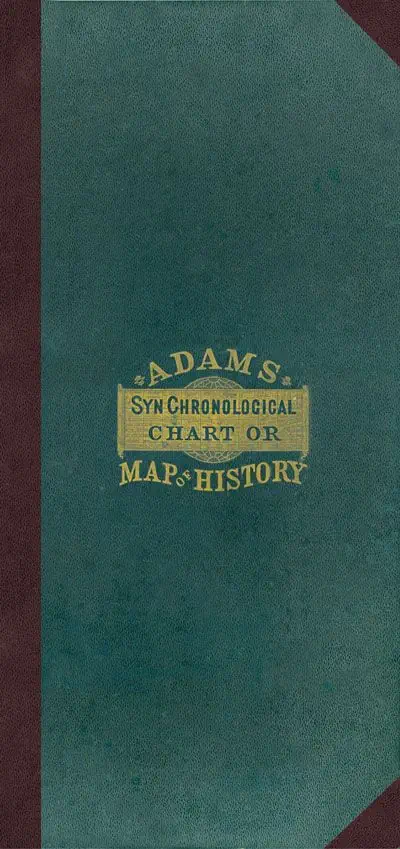
- Author: Sebastian C. Adams
- Language: English
- Subject: History
- Publisher: Strobridge & Company, Cincinnati, OH
- Publication date: 1871
- Publication place: England
- Pages: 15 (original version), +1/2 page in revised/updated version, totaling at 32 with extra material.
- OCLC: 18434872

Adams Synchronological Chart or Map of History, originally published as Chronological Chart of Ancient, Modern and Biblical History is a wallchart which graphically depicts a Biblical genealogy alongside a timeline composed of historic sources from the history of humanity from 4004 BC to modern times.

The scroll traces the course of human history from 4004 BC to 1883 using time lines, flow charts, and family trees that encompass settlements, countries, empires and civilizations around the world, from Babylon, Sparta, and China to Italy, Russia, and Wales. The text is accompanied by pictures of landmark events and personalities, including architectural monuments like the pyramids, history-changing tools and weapons, inventions, and portraits of famous rulers, adventurers, scientists, and cultural figures, as well as everyday people.

Published in 1871 by writer, educator, and Presbyterian minister Sebastian C. Adams, the chart integrates genealogies of the King James Bible with numerous historical references and compendiums (listed in the Sources, below)* merging secular history with a chronological account beginning with Adam and Eve in 4004 B.C. (Note: (date of the Biblical creation of the world proposed by James Ussher, see Young Earth creationism))

The chart was popular enough to be reprinted through several editions, and has been updated to continue into the 21st century. Knock off copies were produced in America and England. One such copy was published by Irish geologist Edward Hull in 1890, which gave an incorrect attribution to him after he added a geologic strata to the chart.

Although new versions remain in print over a hundred years after its first publication, and these newer versions sometimes contain slight amendments to take the years since 1871 into account — they still represent a knowledge of world history, which although considered comprehensive in 1871 — would have to be considerably augmented to represent a more contemporary knowledge.

== Format ==
The chart maintains a Victorian design, and compresses 6,000 years of history into a 23-foot wallchart. It is thoroughly illustrated with tables, and references.

On the overall format of the chronology, the author remarks:

The author is fully aware of the difficulties and uncertainties of any system of Chronology.. it is deemed prudent to base this work on the accepted system of Archbishop James Ussher, upon which a large majority of all our historic and chronological dates are founded. To disturb this system would produce great confusion, with no good results, as the general outlines of history and the relation of one period to another, can be as correctly obtained upon this system, as upon any other, and hinders no one from extending the stream of time back, to suit the chronology of the Septuagint; the claims of the Vedas and Puranas of India; or the uncertainties of Chinese tradition. (Sebastian C. Adams)

=== Design ===
In the chart, the stream of time is represented by a long black flowing line, where every hundred years are marked by upright black pillars, while red lines mark the decades.

Nations and kingdoms are represented by parallel streams each brought into the same divisions of time. When conquered or absorbed into another government, its stream terminates.

These nation streams are segmented into different colours, indicating the reign of a particular ruler or government, and growing wider or thinner in accordance to historical context. Some divide to indicate a split in the nation and indicate the independence of a state, or flow into others to illustrate its conquest, invasion, or acquisition by another nation. In the case of uncertainty or dispute between historical sources — question marks are used.

Numerous tables and references document significant figures shown on the nation streams, such as significant poets, historians, and literary works, which are noted in coloured scrolls near the top of the chart. For example, entries for Joan of Arc, the invention of gunpowder, and the change in navigation with the invention of the compass. During the Roman Empire, red crosses indicate persecution of Christians, while smaller red crosses stand for the Crusades. Red circles denote ecumenical councils.

Suzi Feay of The Independent describes the chart's design for representing a large scope of human history as something that "resembles an unusually complicated digestive system, with its lines, loops, bulges and branches".

==== Influences ====
The design may have inspired later 'Maps of World History' such as the HistoMap by John B. Sparks, which chronicles four thousand years of world history in a graphic way similar to the enlarging and contracting nation streams presented on Adam's chart. Sparks added the innovation of using a logarithmic scale for the presentation of history.

=== Impact ===
According to the book Cartographies of Time: History of the Timeline, the Synchronological Chart "was ninetheenth-century America's surpassing achievement in complexity and synthetic power."

The Oregon Encyclopedia notes that it is now prized by museums and library collections as an early representative of commercial illustration that made history lessons 'colourful and dramatic'.

== Content ==
Since the chart combines secular history with biblical genealogy, it worked back from the time of Christ to peg their start at 4,004 B.C. Above the image of Adam and Eve are the words, "In the beginning God created the Heaven and the Earth" (Genesis 1:1) — beside which the author acknowledges that — "Moses assigns no date to this Creation. Where it begins is unknown".

The genealogies continue until the Deluge and Tower of Babel in 2,348 B.C., and after depicting Noah's flood as described in Genesis (indicated by a black line), the chart splits into two, with the upper portion continuing the biblical genealogy and the lower showing the division into nations supposedly after the confusion of tongues at the Tower of Babel.

The nation streams are interspersed with numerous tables containing, for example: A list of Assyrian kings, a list of kings of Babylon, cuneiform inscriptions, tables comparing the development of the alphabet from Hebrew, Phoenician, Persian, and Greek, and a list of the Seven Wonders of the Ancient World.

At certain points of the chart, large parts are occupied by big empires such as the Babylonian Empire (under the reign of Nebuchadnezzar II), the Persian Empire, the Macedonian Empire, and the Roman Empire, which, at one point, occupies almost the entire part of the chart used for nation streams. After the fall of Rome, the empire's colossal nation stream is divided into many smaller streams of barbarian kingdoms. The independence of many colonies is clearly shown as big nation streams standing for colonial empires split into several smaller streams.

Numerous insets remark the discovery of significant inventions such as Galileo Galilei with the pendulum and the telescope, Johannes Gutenberg with the printing press, James Watt with his improved steam engine, and William Shakespeare reading his plays to Queen Elizabeth I.

== Sources ==
Sources are listed within the chart itself, right beside the Colby & Co Publishers:

- English Historian: Edward Gibbon
- Greek Historians: i) Herodotus, ii) Thucydides, iii) Livy, iv) Sallust, v) Pliny the Elder, and vi) Tacitus.
- George Rawlinson's Ancient Monarchies
- John Gardner Wilkinson's Ancient Egyptians
- Austen Henry Layard's Nineveh and Babylon
- Xenophon's Works
- Charles Rollin's Ancient History
- History of the World by Samuel Maunder
- Universal History of the World by Johannes von Müller
- Cyclopædia of Biography
- Compendium of History by Kerney
- Worcester's History
- Goodrich's Universal History
- Hawes' Synchronology
- Haydn's Dictionary of Dates
- Archbishop James Ussher's Annals of the Old and New Testaments
- Antoine Augustin Calmet's Dictionary of the Bible
- Humphrey Prideaux’s Connexions
- George Grote's History of Greece
- Goodrich’s History of Greece
- The Arundelian Marbles or Parian Chronicle (37 statues, 128 busts, and 250 inscriptions containing the history of Greece from 1582 to 355 BC located in Oxford)
- The Bible (King James Version)

== Endorsements ==
=== Notable ===
- "It is worth a library of books on the subject of history" (G. McCloskie, L.L.D. Professor of Natural History at Princeton College)
- "Indicates at a glance the date, progress, and synchronism of historical events, as clearly as could be learned in days and weeks in ordinary historical works" (A.D. Hager, Secretary, Chicago Historical Society)
- "The plan adopted is a very ingenious one is such that the student sees at a glance exactly the condition of the world at any given date" (Scientific American)

== Image of 1881 edition ==
Composite image of the 1881 edition.
