= Sebastian C. Adams =

American politician (1825–1898)

Sebastian Cabot Adams
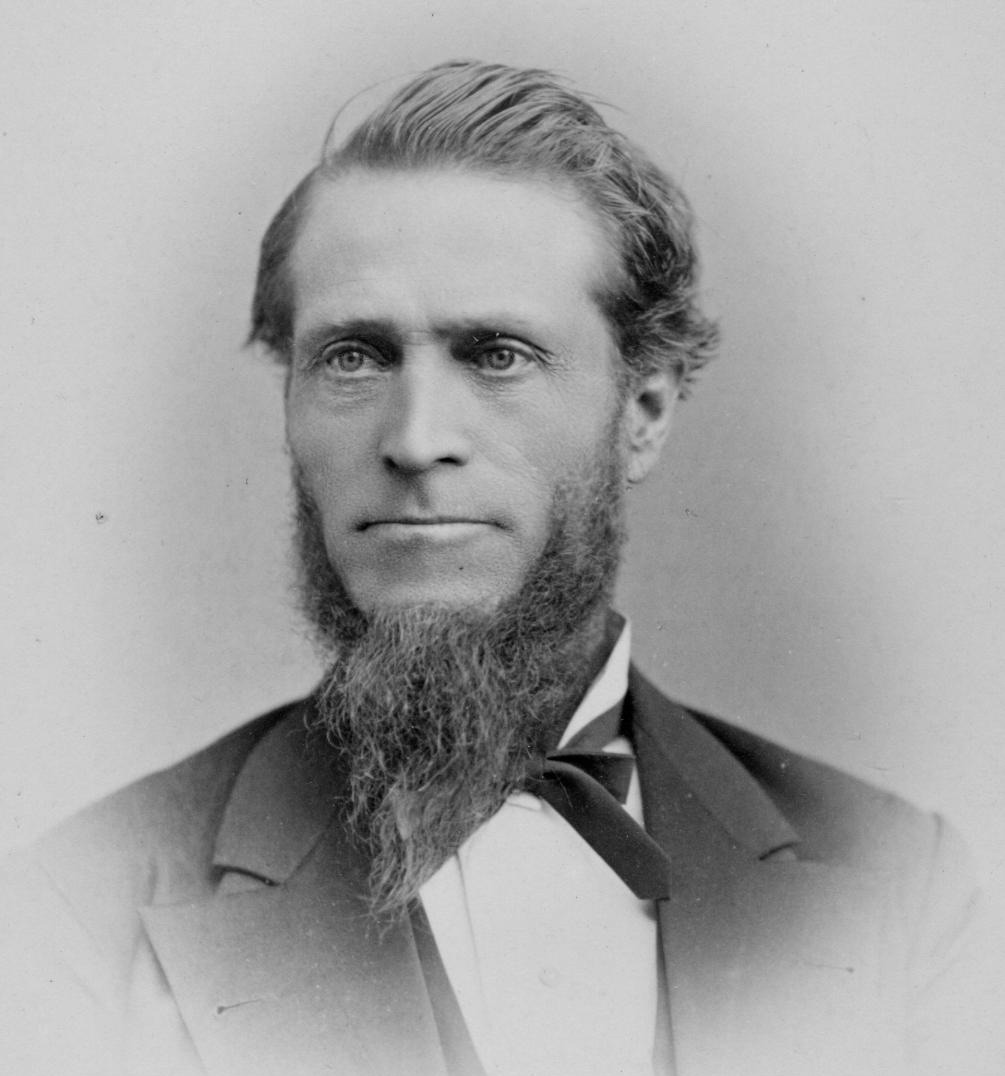
- Born: July 28, 1825; Huron, Ohio, US
- Died: January 5, 1898 (aged 72); Marion County, Oregon, U.S

Sebastian Cabot Adams (July 28, 1825 – January 5, 1898) was an American writer, historian, Presbyterian minister, and politician. He was a brother-in-law of U.S. Senator George W. McBride. He is remembered as one of Salem's most honored citizens, an inspiring minister, teacher, and businessman.

Adams was born in Huron, Ohio. He was a founder of McMinville, Oregon, as well as Linfield College.

When he was twelve years old, he moved to Illinois with his family. In 1850, as a young adult, he traversed the arduous Oregon Trail on foot and settled in Oregon, where he taught school (1852-54). He eventually opened his own school which became Linfield College.

Adams Synchronological Chart, 1881

He also worked as a preacher, surveyor, county clerk, and State Senator while living in Yamhill County, Oregon. He was an avid historian, spending years compiling his Adams Synchronological Chart or Map of History. He writes:

It is fondly hoped that all friends of education and knowledge will duly appreciate the years of toil and study spent in arranging, from fragmentary and disconnected records of the world's history this instructive and beautiful panorama. Its plan is simple, its utility obvious, and its value, as you estimate knowledge. (from the text of the chart itself)

The Oregon Encyclopedia notes that his chart is now prized by museums and library collections as an early representation of commercial illustration that made history lessons "colorful and dramatic".

== Death ==
Adams died on January 5, 1898, at the age of 72.

== Bibliography ==
- Chronological Chart of Ancient, Modern and Biblical History (1871)
