= Tessa Rumsey =

American poet based in San Francisco

Tessa Rumsey (1970) is an American poet based in San Francisco.

Her poems have appeared in Colorado Review, Denver Quarterly, Fence, The New Republic. She is a graduate in 1992 in Philosophy from Sarah Lawrence College. Later studying at the Iowa Writers’ Workshop where she received an MFA and in 2002 she received an MA in Visual and Critical Studies at California College of the Arts.

== Work ==
- "Everlasting Gobstopper", Slope 10
- "June Inside You", Electronic Poetry Review, Spring 2001
- "April Fools", Electronic Poetry Review, Spring 2001
- Assembling the Shepherd. University of Georgia Press. 1999. ISBN 978-0-8203-2168-4.
- The Return Message. W W Norton & Co Inc. 2006. ISBN 978-0-393-32913-1.
- Bulletproof. University of Iowa. 1994.

=== Ploughshares literary journal ===
- "Wilderness Is Everywhere". Ploughshares. Winter 2001–2002. Archived from the original on November 4, 2007.
- "Copperopolis". Ploughshares. Winter 2001–2002. Archived from the original on November 4, 2007.
- "Headset". Ploughshares. Winter 2001–2002. Archived from the original on November 4, 2007.

== Awards ==
- 1998 – Contemporary Poetry Series Competition, for Assembling the Shepherd
- 2004 – Barnard Women Poets Prize
