= Wallchart =

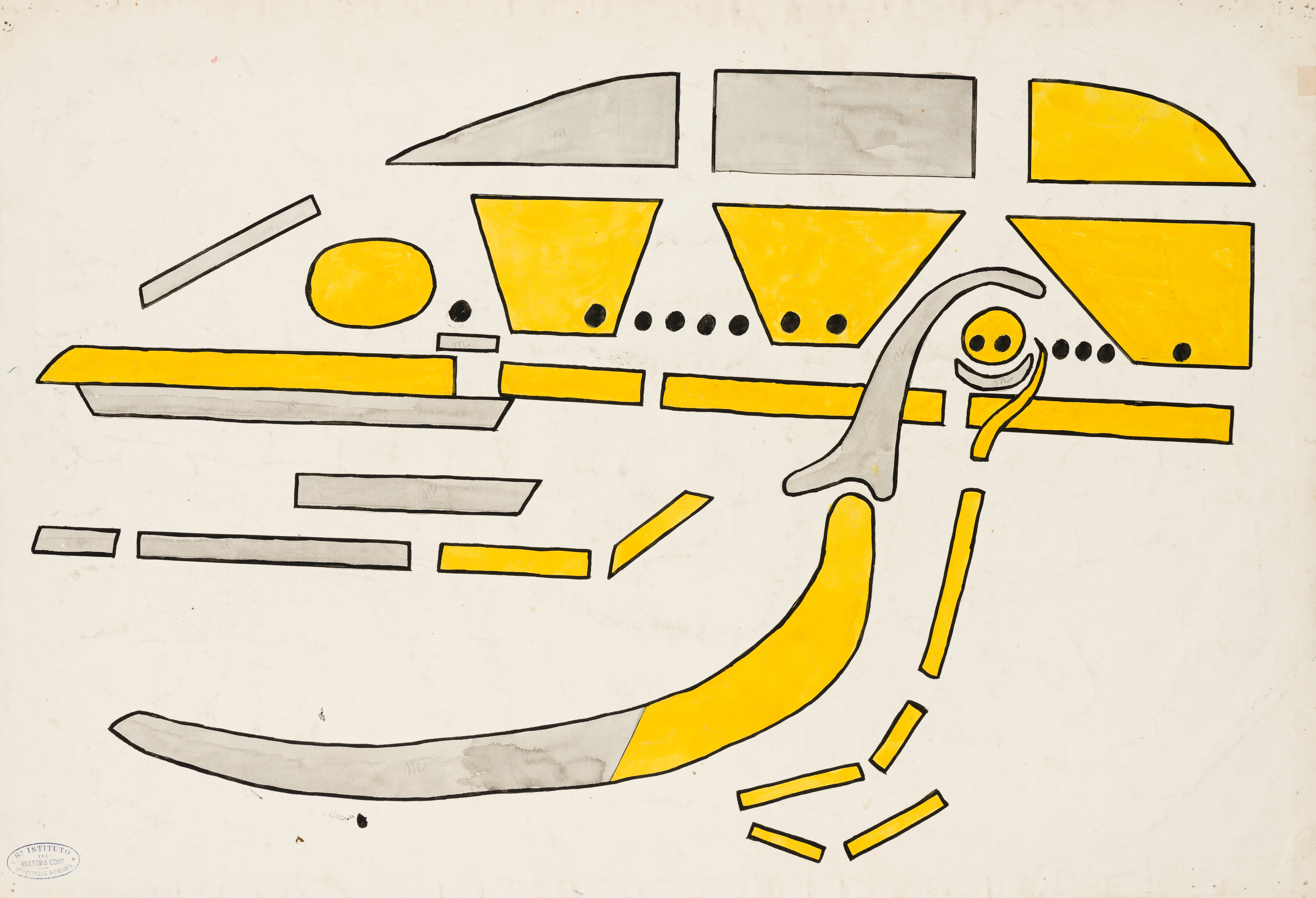
Didactic wall chart with a schematic skull of a tetrapod.

A wallchart is a type of large poster often displaying information for educational use or entertainment. One popular use of a wallchart is to track progress of sports teams in cup events.

During 2006 the practice of giving away wallcharts in British newspapers rose in popularity. Many papers including The Guardian, The Daily Mail and The Independent participated, with subjects varying from the "Sky At Night" to "British birds". Marc Sands, marketing director of The Guardian describes wallcharts as one of their most successful promotions excluding free DVDs in the Guardian editor's blog. The December 16 edition of The Guardian distributed a free 'Guide to Guardian Readers' wallchart illustrated by Posy Simmonds.

The subjects of later wallcharts included Pork and Apples, and Private Eye, perhaps doubting the usefulness of these items, satirised the growing trend with spoof advertisements for wallcharts on "Britain's Best-Loved Wasps" and "Britain's Favourite Wallcharts" as well as a cartoon depicting "Hadrian's Wallchart" (subject: Barbarians). Issue 1168 featured the tag line "Inside: No Free Wallchart!"
