= City map =

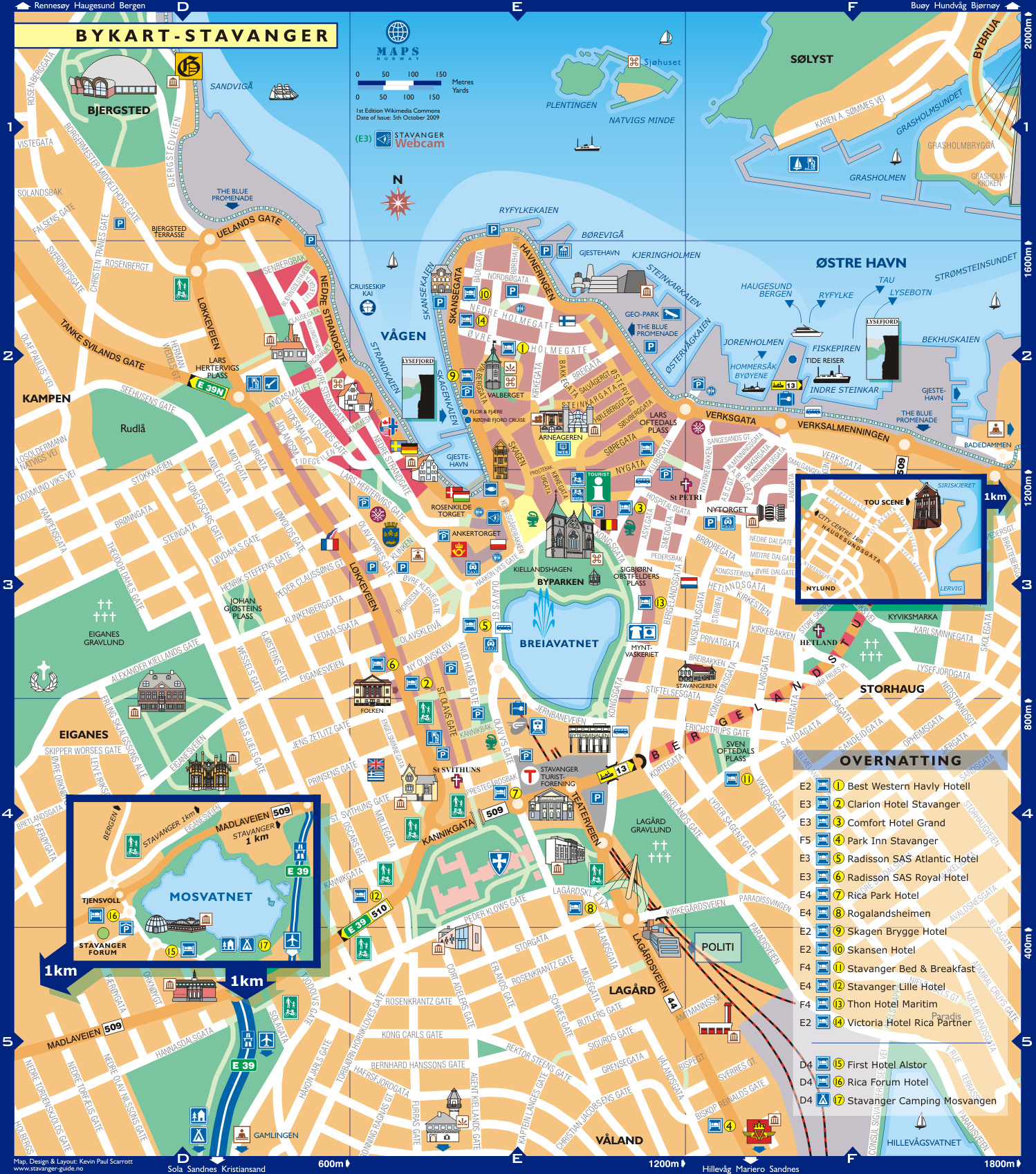
City map of Stavanger (Norway).

A city map is a large-scale thematic map of a city (or part of a city) created to enable the fastest possible orientation in an urban space. The graphic representation of objects on a city map is therefore usually greatly simplified, and reduced to generally understood symbology.

Depending upon its target group or market, a city map will include not only the city's transport network, but also other important information, such as city sights or public institutions.

== Content and design ==
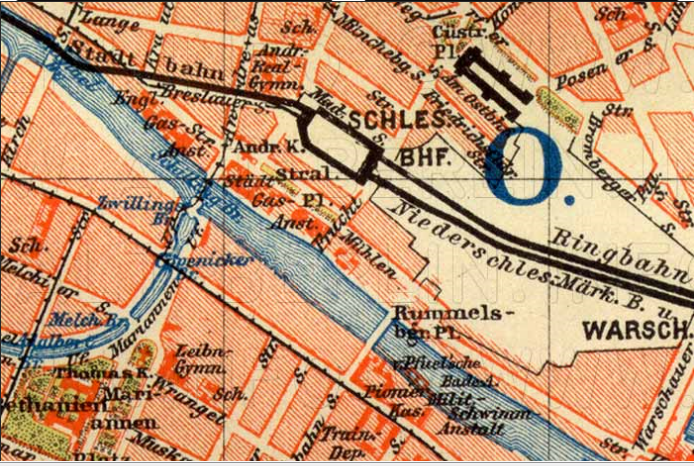
Detail from a city map of Berlin from 1895.

The scale of a city map is usually between 1:10,000 and 1:25,000. Densely settled downtown areas will sometimes be partly drawn in a larger scale, on a separate detail map.

In addition to linear true to scale maps, there are also maps with variable scale, for example where the scale gradually increases towards the city centre (aerial photography, and photogrammetry methods).

Central to the information provided by a city map is the street network, including its street names (often supplemented by at least a selection of individual house numbers), along with buildings, parks and waterways. Streets and points of interest are usually also listed in a legend or register, locating objects on a map grid on the map. Important places such as administrative buildings, cultural institutions, attractions, etc. may be highlighted with the assistance of pictograms. The map may also be complemented by representations of public transport facilities.

== History ==
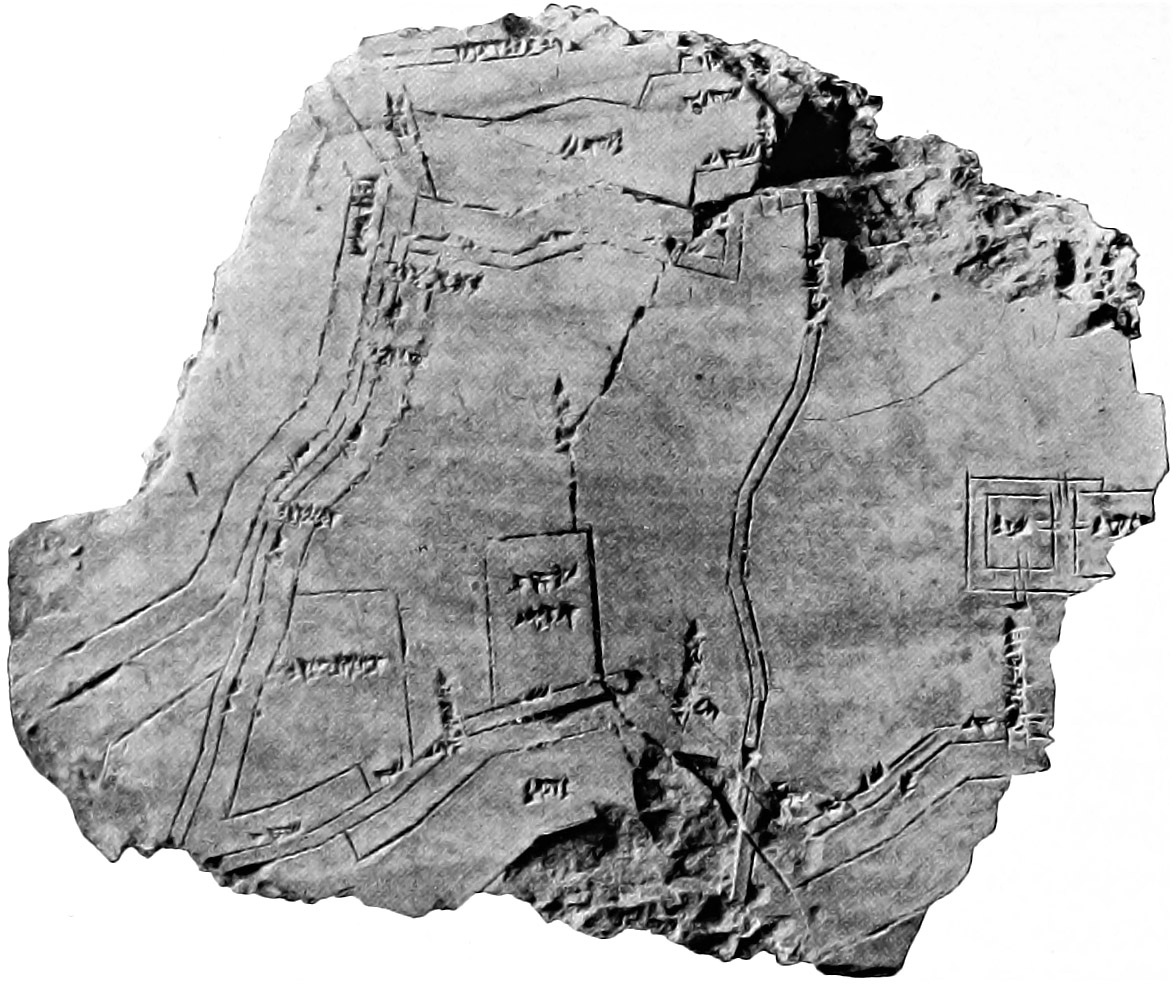
Clay tablet with map of the Babylonian city of Nippur (ca. 1400 BC)

=== Ancient Near East ===
As early as the time of the Ancient Near East, clay tablets were being produced with scaled, graphical representations of cities. Excavations of the Sumerian city of Nippur brought to light a fragment of an approximately 3,500-year-old city map, which is sometimes referred to as the oldest known city map. The clay tablet depicts the temple of Enlil, a city park, the city wall including its gates, along with a canal and the river Euphrates. The individual objects on this map were already labelled, in a Sumerian cuneiform.

=== Late Middle Ages ===
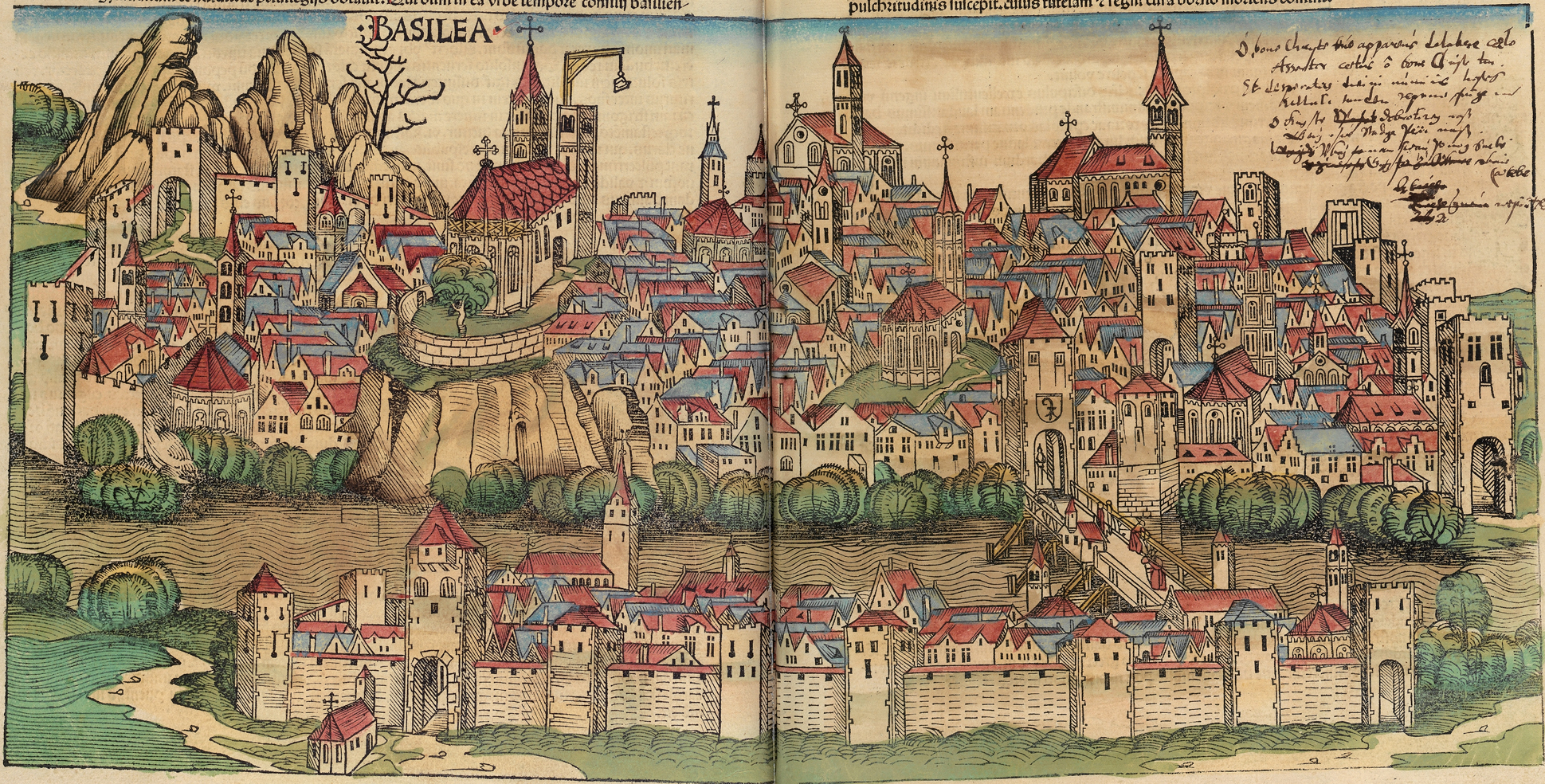
View of Basel, Switzerland, ca 1490, from the Nuremberg Chronicle.

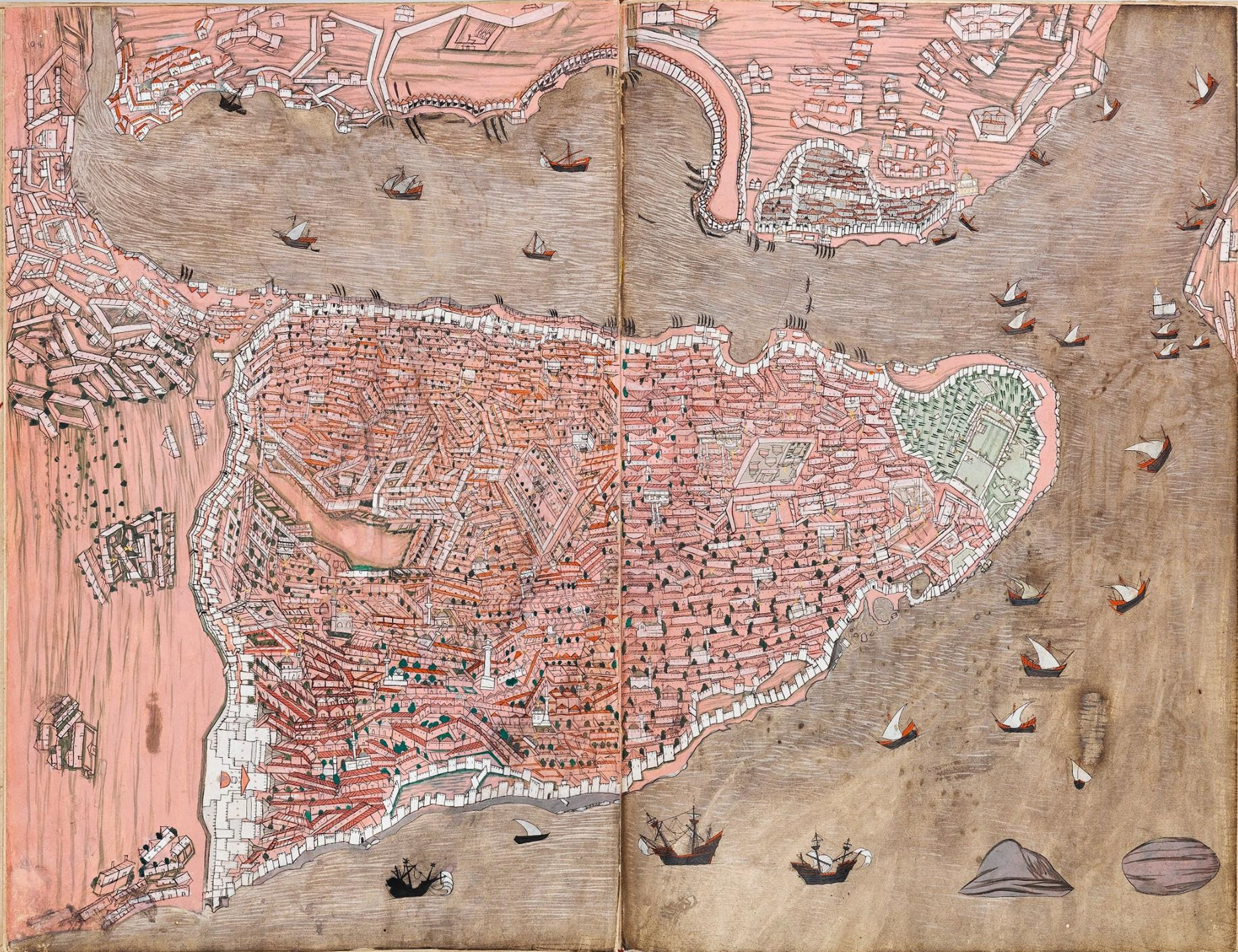
Map of Istanbul, Hunername-I (1523)

In manuscripts and early printed books of the Late Middle Ages, cities are often shown in profile, or viewed from an elevated standpoint. Nautical charts of that time sometimes depict partly stylized cityscapes drawn in pictogram form - for example in Cristoforo Buondelmonti's Liber insularum archipelagi (Book of Islands), from the year 1422.

The Nuremberg Chronicle, which first appeared in 1493, is one of the most important collections of city views of the late Middle Ages, with over 100 such illustrations. Nevertheless, panoramas like this one, or the one in Bernhard von Breydenbach's Travelogue from 1483, had more narrative or representative functions.

Illustrated in these works are the local conditions and relevant characteristics - such as ports, magnificent buildings, walls, etc. - as a background for highlighting historical descriptions or economic benefits of the city. On the other hand, less emphasis was placed on accuracy: in the Nuremberg Chronicle, merely one quarter of the city views represented the actual appearance of the subject city, and some individual images were even used simultaneously to represent several different cities.

=== Renaissance ===
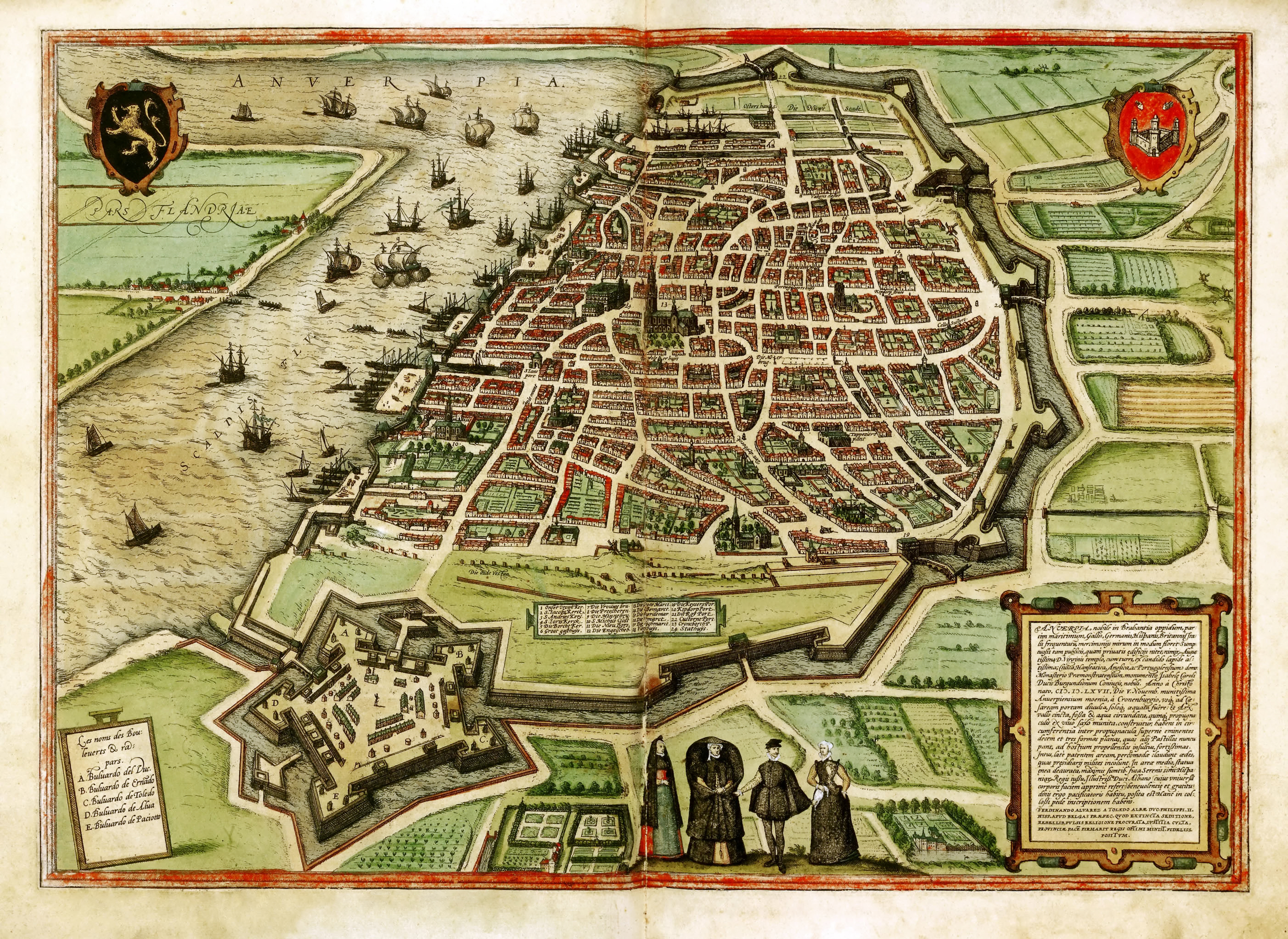
Antwerp (engraving), ca 1572, by Georg Braun and Frans Hogenberg.

In the 16th century, the artists and scholars of the Renaissance had extensive knowledge of mathematical perspectives and projections. This knowledge also affected the work of cartographers and the production of cityscapes (especially in Italy). A key innovation was that the city was no longer portrayed simply from an imaginary or real perspective, but drawn initially as a two-dimensional map, and then, using a process of accurate perspective drawing, transformed into a three-dimensional image. An early example of a geometrically exact and highly detailed work of this kind is the city map of Venice created by Jacopo de' Barbari in around 1500.

Whereas the illustrations of the late Middle Ages are usually still simple small-format woodcuts, an increasingly common process from 1500 onwards was the creation of prints from huge woodcuts and woodblocks. Jacopo de' Barbari's map of Venice was already as large as 139 centimetres (55 in) x 282 centimetres (111 in), and consisted of six individual panels. From the middle of the 16th century, the copperplate process began to compete with the woodcut, and allowed far more refined and detailed illustrations.

=== 19th Century pocket atlases ===
One of the first city pocket atlases, and the first pocket atlas of London, was "Collins' Illustrated Atlas of London" published in 1854 and drawn and engraved by Richard Jarman.

== See also ==
- 3D city model
- Cartography
- Street map
