= Cecil H. Green Library =

Library at Stanford University

Coordinates: 37.42678°N 122.16707°W

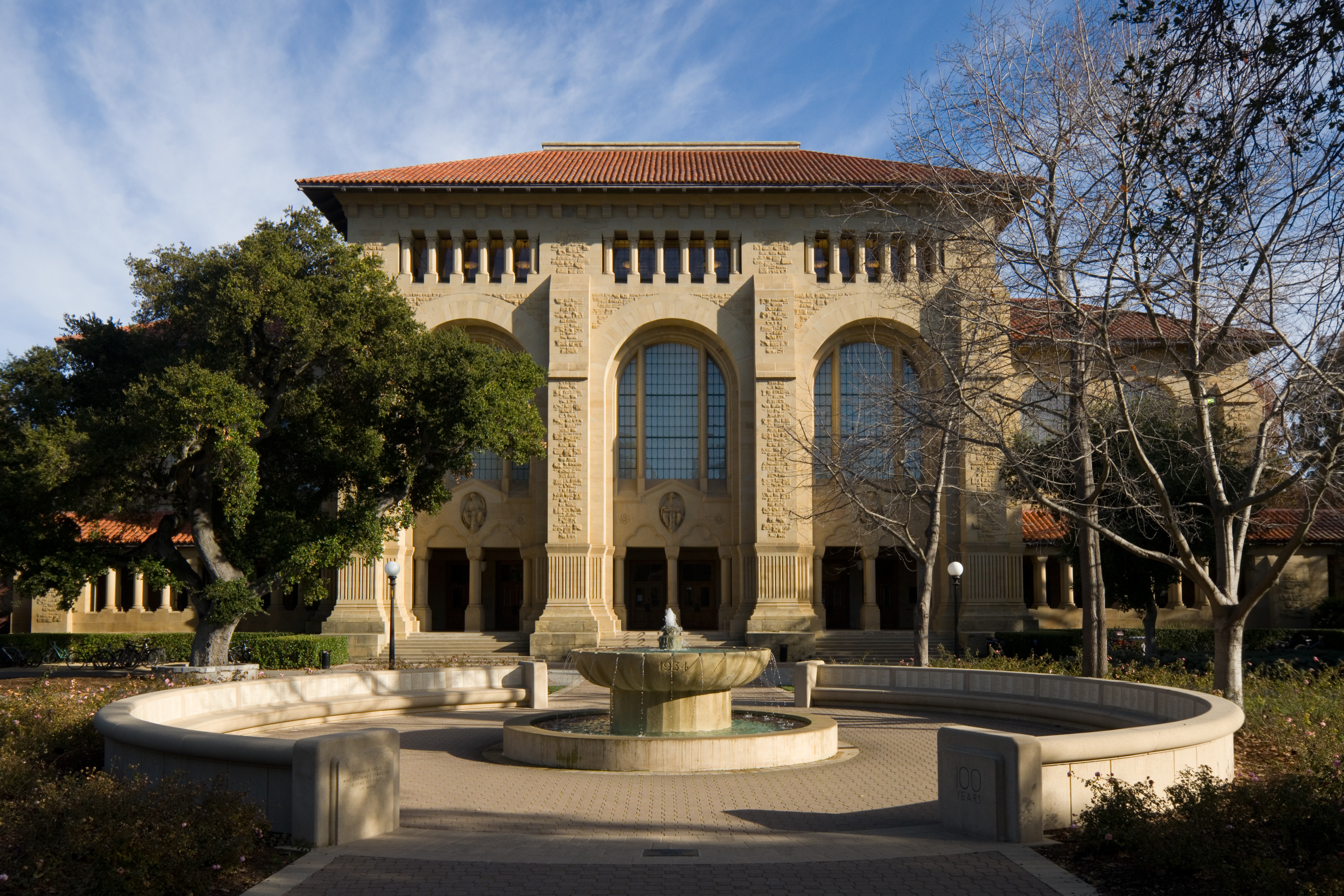
- Location: Stanford University, Stanford, California
- Type: Academic library
- Established: 1919
- Architect: Arthur Brown Jr.

Other information
- Website: library.stanford.edu

The Cecil H. Green Library (commonly known as Green Library) is the main library on the Stanford University campus and is part of the SUL system. It is named for Cecil H. Green.

Green Library houses 4 million volumes, most of which are related to the humanities and social sciences. Libraries elsewhere on campus cover specialized areas such as Business, Law, Art, Medicine, or Engineering.

Books from Green and other Stanford libraries are being scanned as part of the Google Books project.

== History ==
The earliest library at Stanford was in the inner quadrangle. It was housed in one large room capable of accommodating 100 readers. This was replaced in 1900 by a separate building on the outer quadrangle, named the Thomas Welton Stanford library after its major donor. This library was recognized as being too small, and a new larger library in a separate building was begun, but it was destroyed in the 1906 San Francisco earthquake before it could be occupied.

A major new library was approved in 1913 and completed in 1919. This building forms the older portion of the Green Library. In 1980, a larger annex was added and the library renamed for Cecil H. Green. The original part of the building is now known as the Bing Wing for Peter Bing, who donated a substantial amount of money for fixing it after the 1989 Loma Prieta earthquake.

== Design ==
Green Library's design was a significant and early departure from the architectural style of Stanford's Main Quad. Jane Stanford held a design competition for the new library and chose the submission of Joseph MacKay, a San Francisco art glassmaker, which drew more on Romanesque style than the existing buildings. Several stories tall, this original construction was refurbished in 1999 and now forms the main halls and rotunda of the library.

== See also ==
- Stanford University Libraries
