= Cartography of Ukraine =

UN map of Ukraine. Map of the Russo-Ukrainian War (2014-...)

Online: maps.visicom.ua • meteo.gov.ua • alerts.in.ua • liveuamap.com • deepstatemap.live • understandingwar.org

The cartography of Ukraine involves the history of surveying and the construction of maps of Ukraine.

== Early maps ==
The oldest-known 'map' of part of Ukraine is the Dura-Europos route map, found in 1923 on the shield of a Roman soldier (dated to the 230s) in Dura-Europos on the banks of the Euphrates in present-day Syria. It features part of the Black Sea coast, including the Greek names of cities on the territory of modern Ukraine, such as Τύρα μί(λια) πδ´ or Tyras, near modern Bilhorod-Dnistrovskyi, and the Borysthenes river (Dnipro). Hand-drawn maps of Ukraine have been produced since the Middle Ages.

Polish historian Bernard Wapowski was the first to create modern "maps of Poland and Lithuania (or Southern Sarmatia), includ[ing] Ukraine as far east as the Dnieper River and the Black Sea", in 1526 and 1528. Battista Agnese's 1548 map was the first to include Ukrainian territory east of the Dnipro, and south of the Black Sea and Sea of Azov. Especially the Black Sea region was well-mapped due to its strategic and economic importance as the Ottoman Empire rose as a regional power.

During the Turkish wars between 1568 and 1918, high-quality French maps were kept as state secrets amid diplomatic negotiations, while 20th-century maps have reflected the region's multiple changes of government.

Ukraine is largely absent from the maps of the Turkish manuscript mapping-tradition that flourished during the reign of the Ottoman Sultan Mehmed II the Conqueror (r. 1444–1446, 1451–1481); the Mediterranean received its own section in world maps, but typical Turkish maps of the period omitted the Black Sea, and the entire region of the Rus' appeared as just a small portion of Asia between the Caspian and the Mediterranean.

== 17th century ==
Two centuries later Guillaume le Vasseur, sieur de Beauplan became one of the more prominent cartographers working with Ukrainian data. His 1639 descriptive map of the region was the first such one produced, and after he published a pair of Ukraine maps of different scale in 1660, his drawings were republished throughout much of Europe. A copy of de Beauplan's maps played a crucial role in negotiations between the Polish-Lithuanian Commonwealth and the Ottoman Empire in 1640; its depiction of the disputed Kodak Fortress was of such quality that the head Polish ambassador, Wojciech Miaskowski, deemed it dangerous to exhibit it to his Turkish counterparts.

Giacomo Cantelli da Vignola's 1684 map of Tartaria d'Europa includes "Vkraina o Paese dei Cossachi de Zaporowa" [Ukraine or the land of the Zaporozhian Cossacks].

== 18th century ==
English-language maps of 1769 depicted the Crimean Khanate as part of its suzerain, the Ottoman Empire, with clear boundaries between the Muslim-ruled states in the south and the Christian-ruled states to the north. Another map from the eighteenth century, inscribed in Latin, was careful to depict a small buffer zone between Kiev and the Polish border.

== Modern maps ==
In more recent history, maps of the country have reflected its tumultuous political status and relations with Russia; for example, the city known as "Lvov" (Russian: Львов) during the Soviet era (until 1991) was depicted as "Leopol" or "Lemberg" during its time (1772–1918) in the Habsburg realms, while post-Soviet maps produced in Ukraine have referred to it by its endonym of "Lviv" (Ukrainian: Львів). (Under Polish rule (1272–1772) it went by the Polish name of Lwów).

== List ==
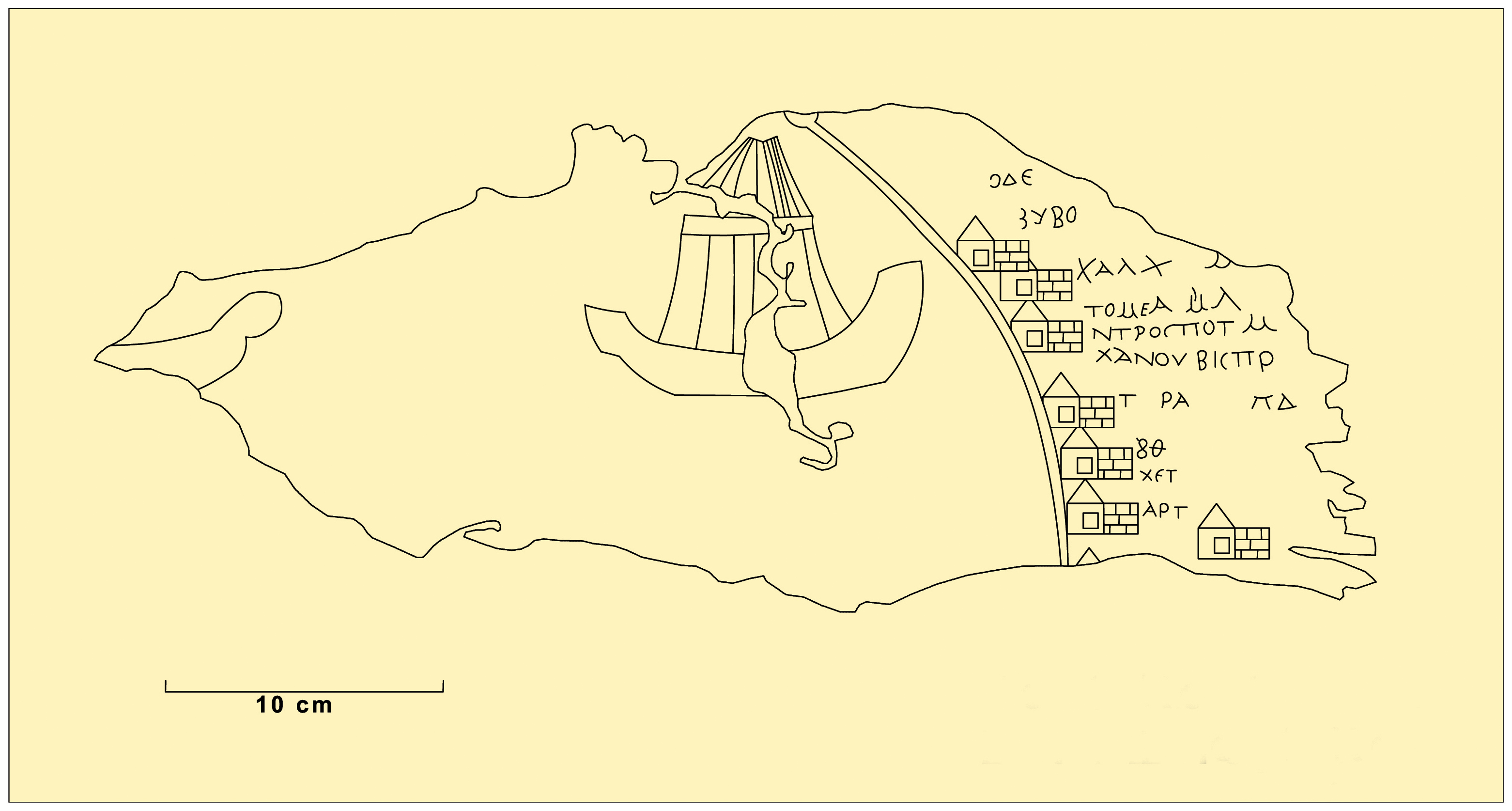
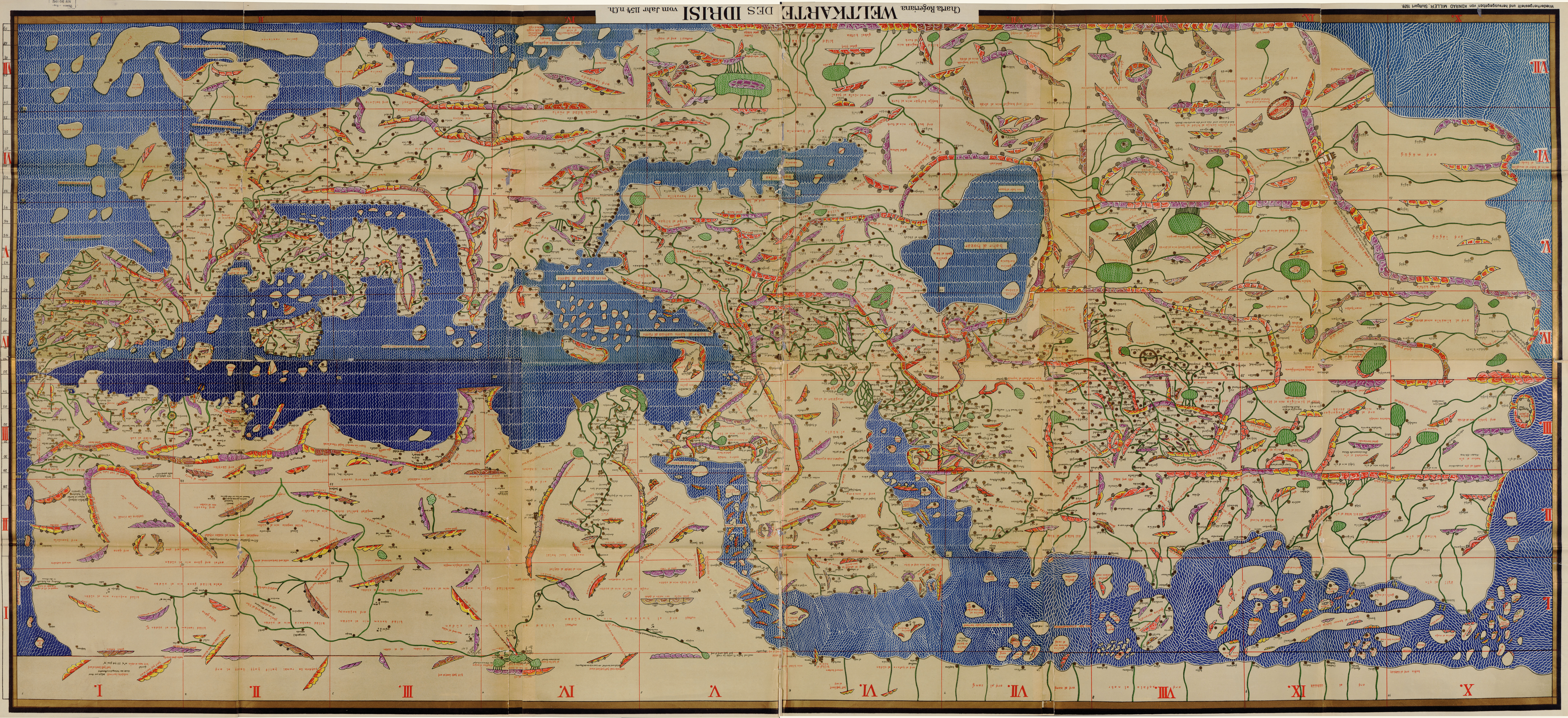
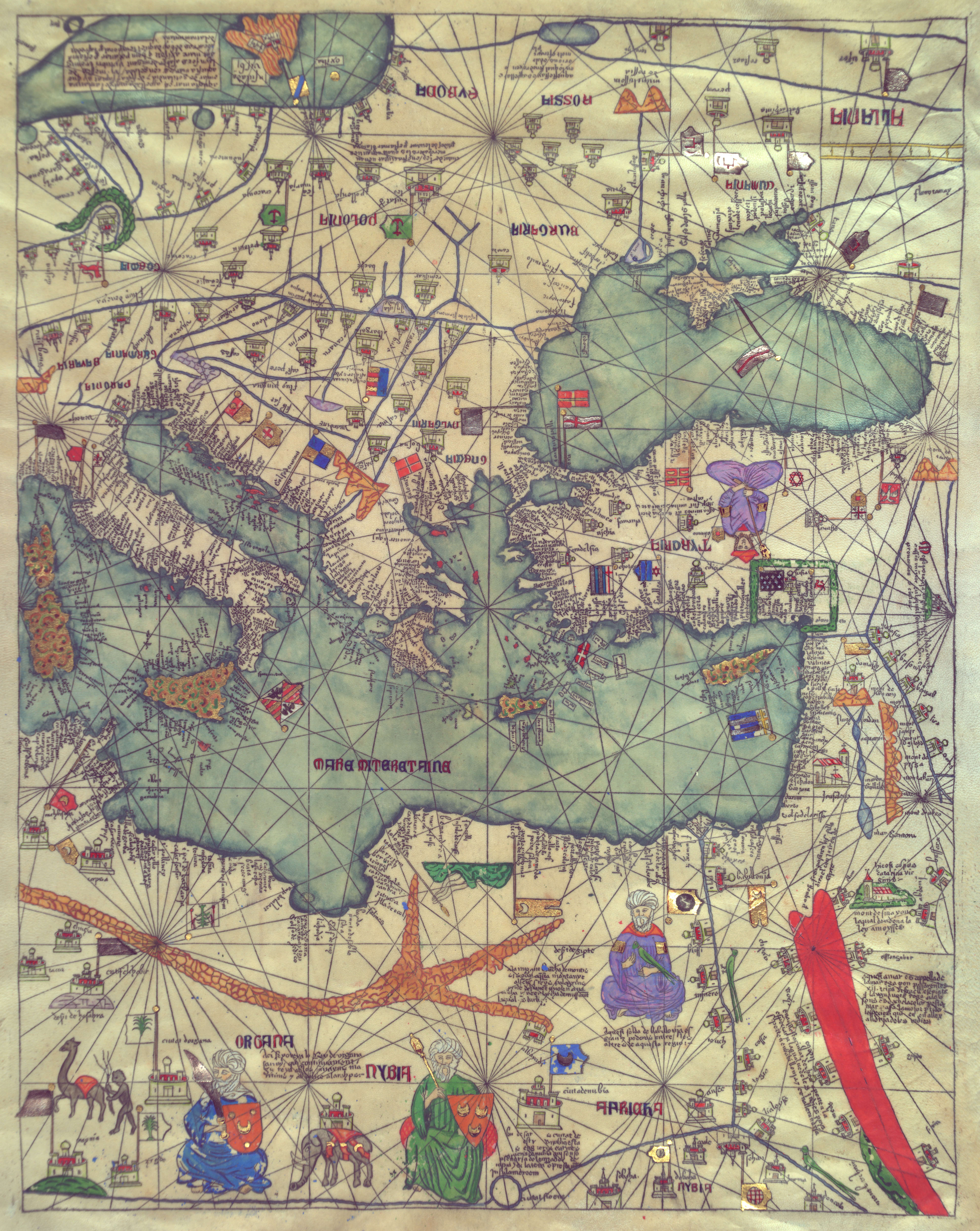
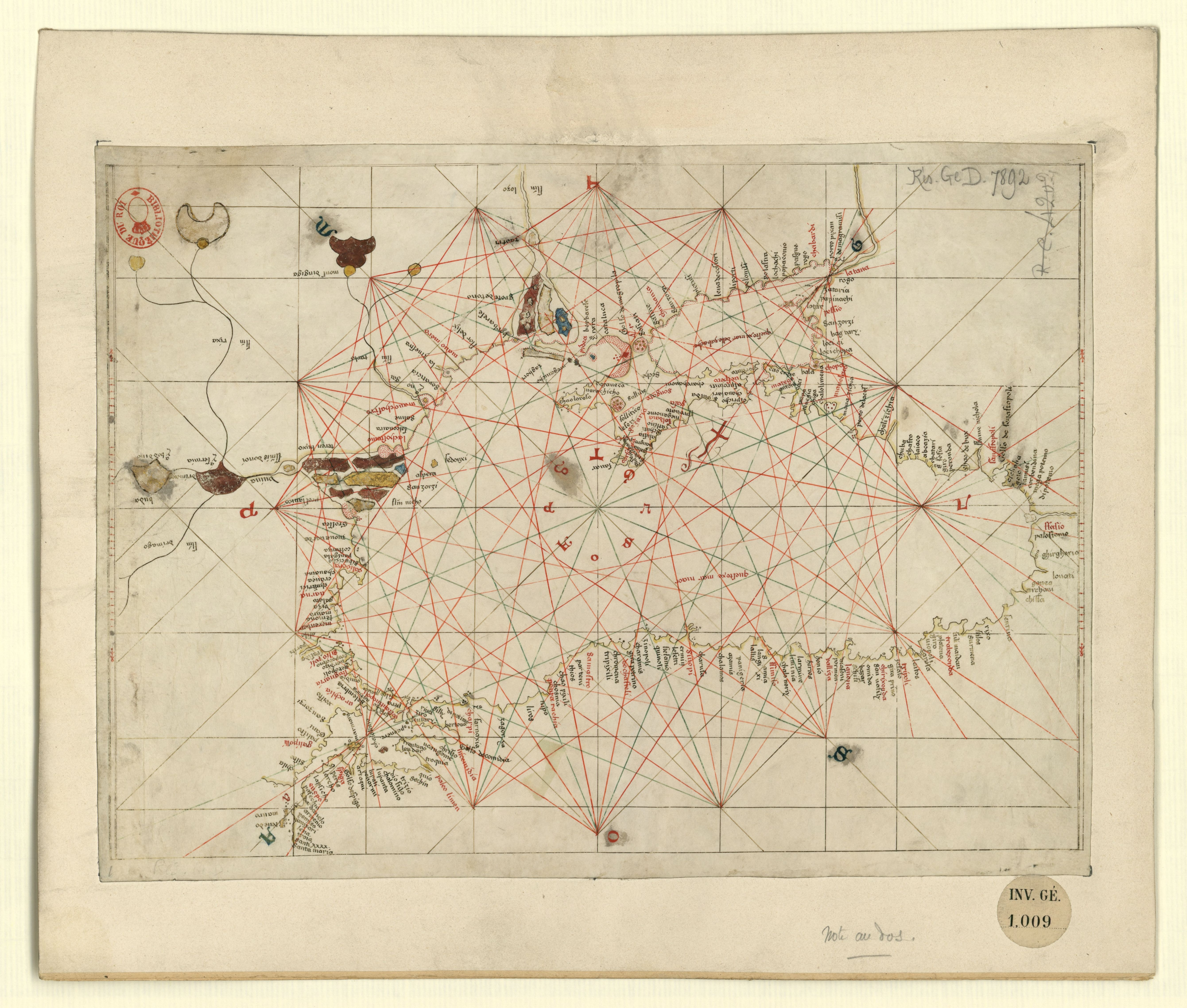
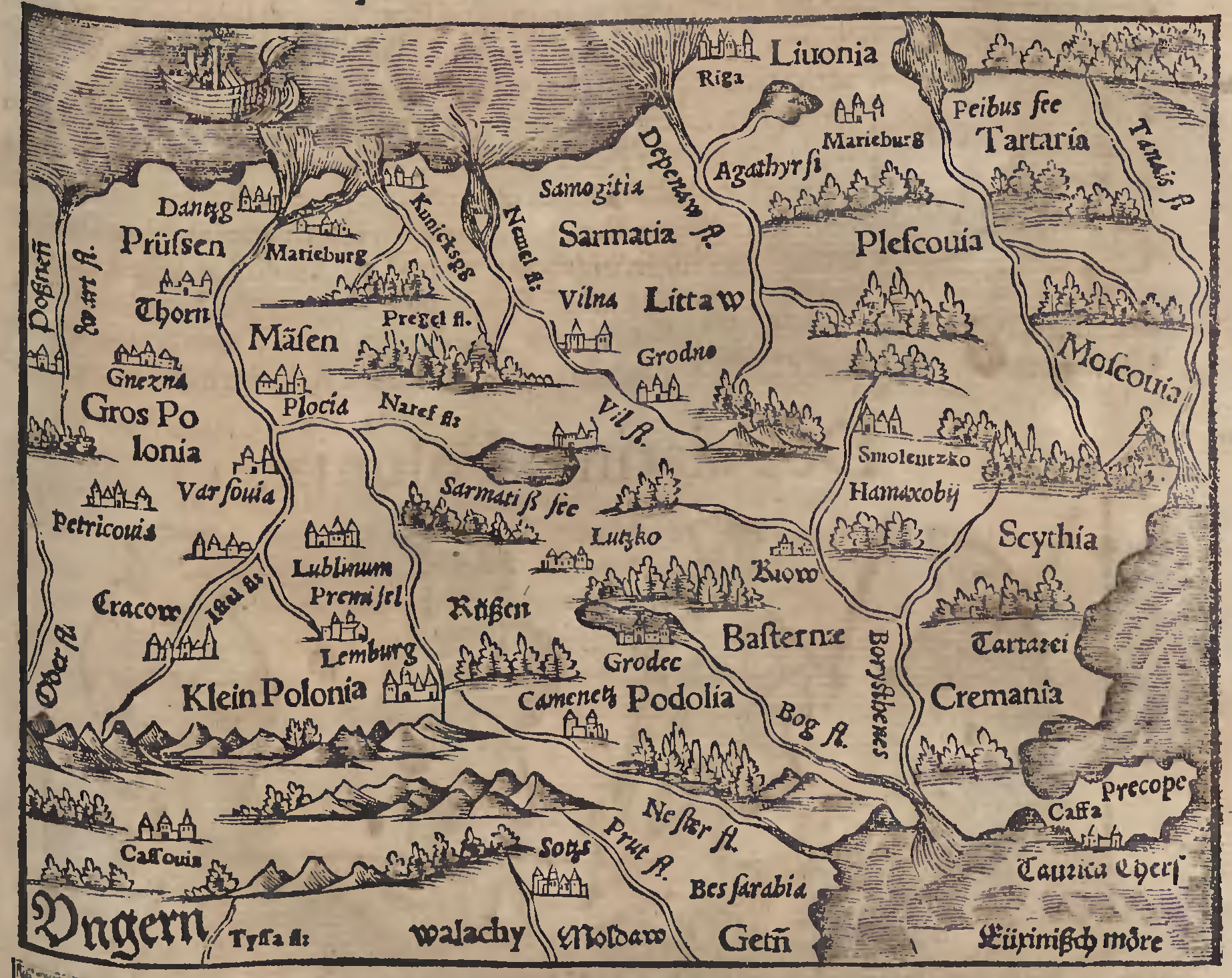
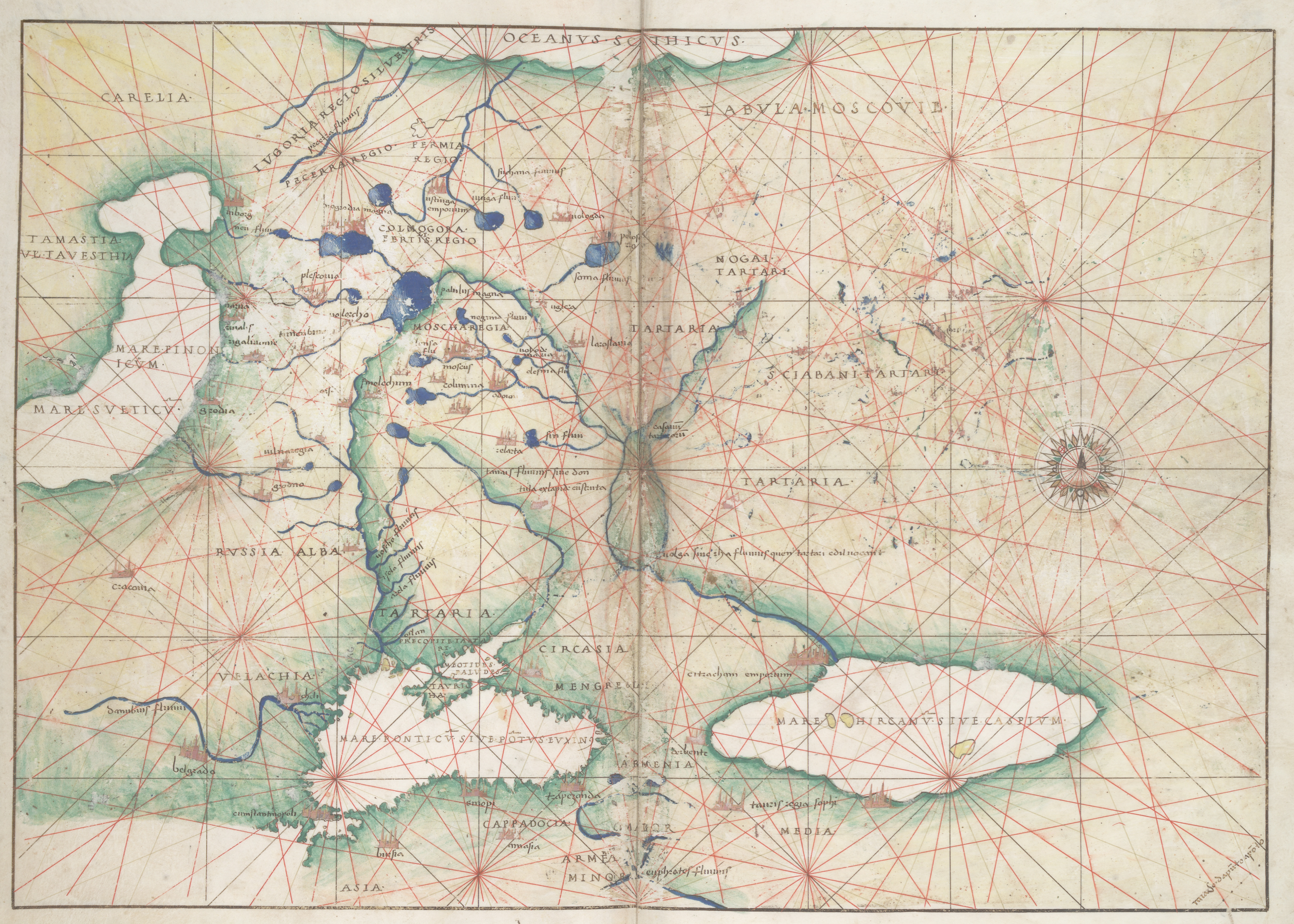
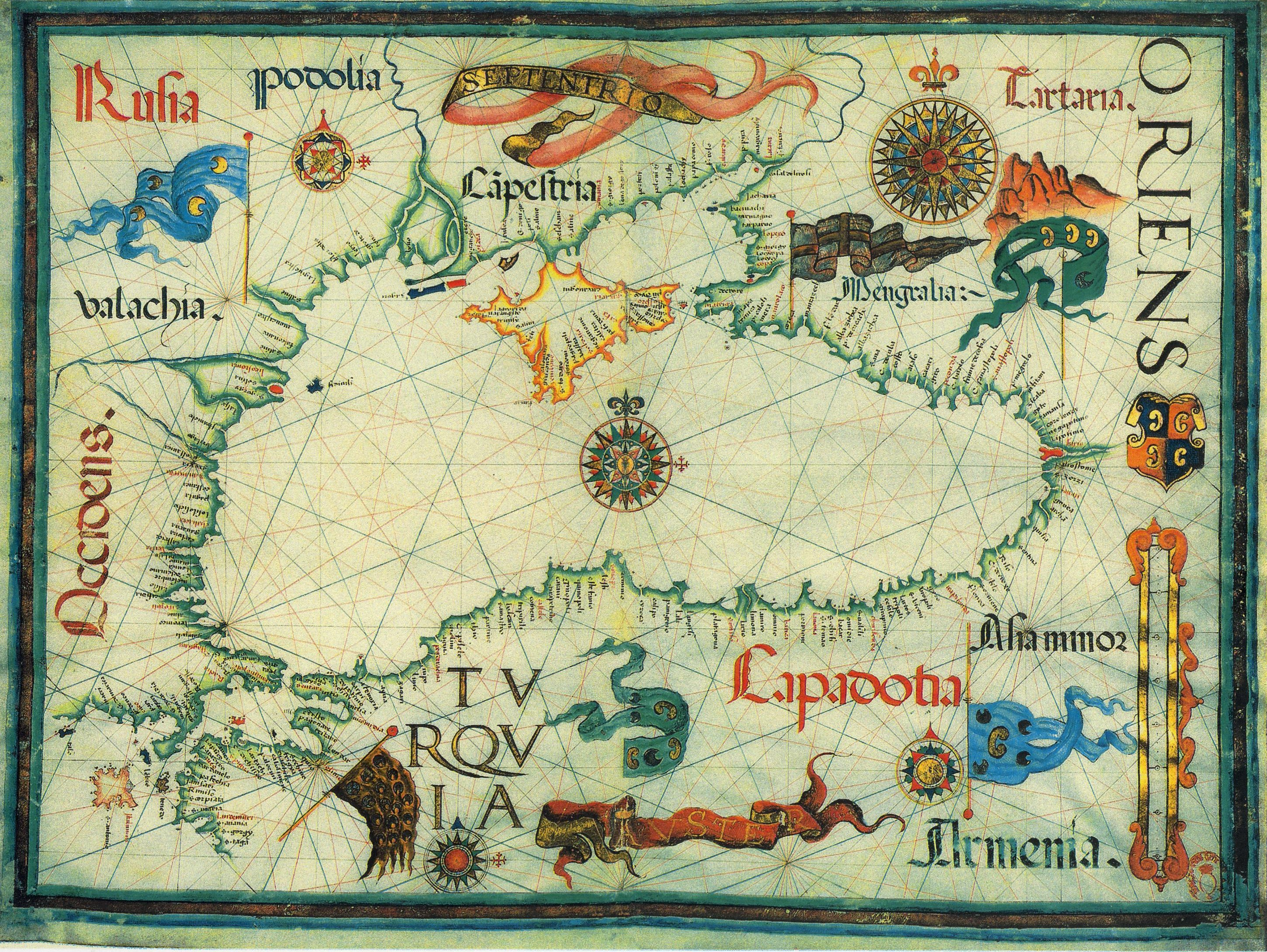
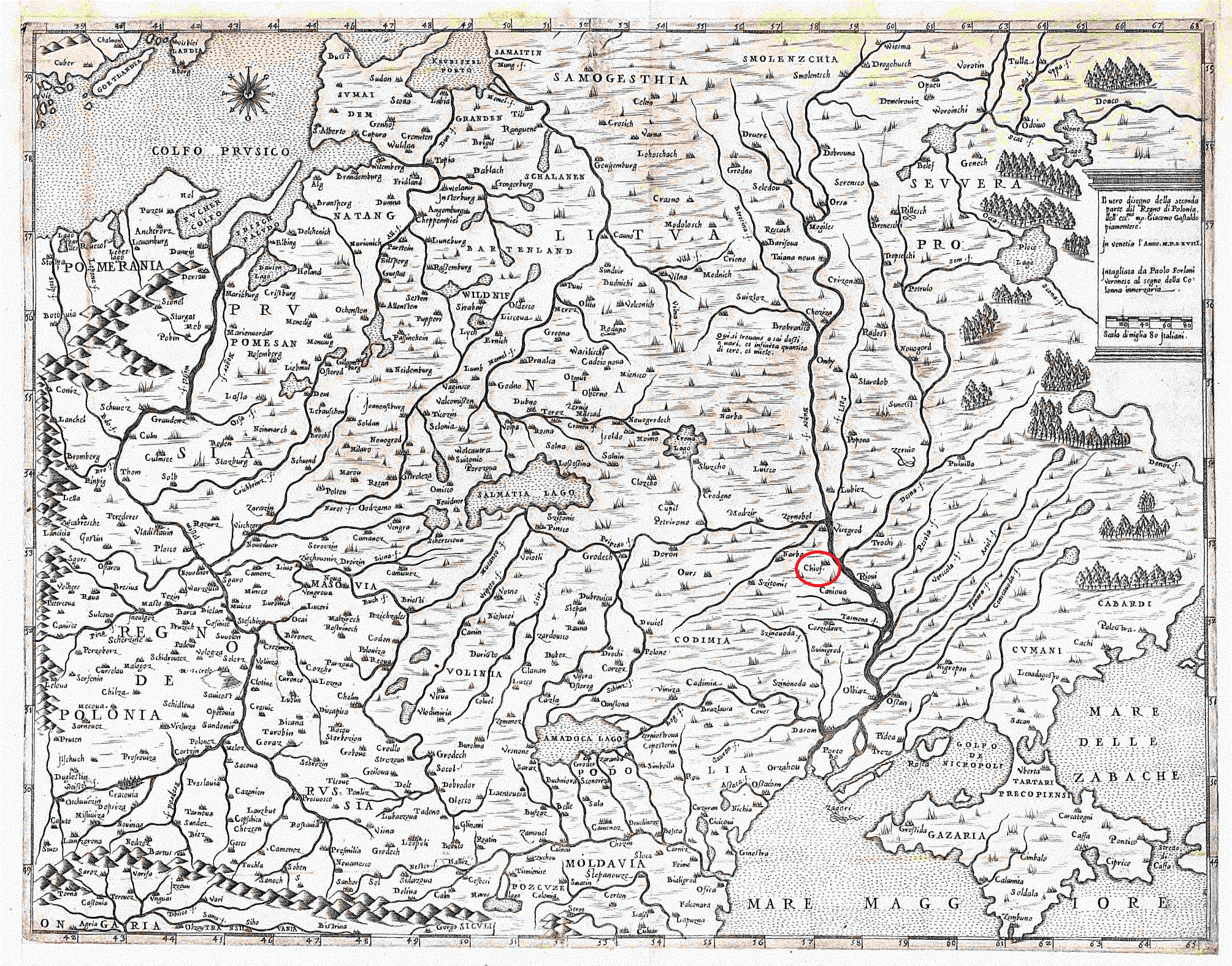
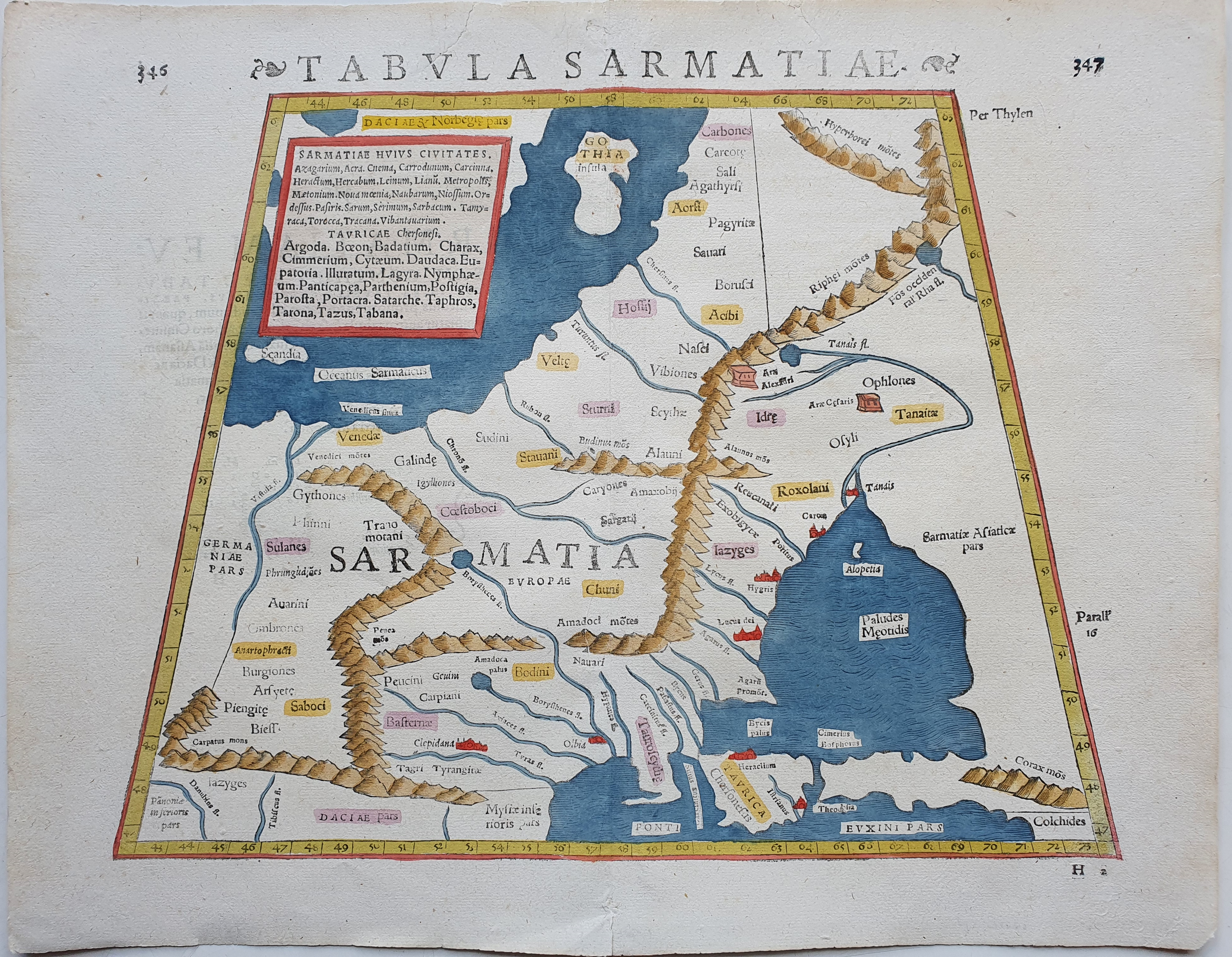
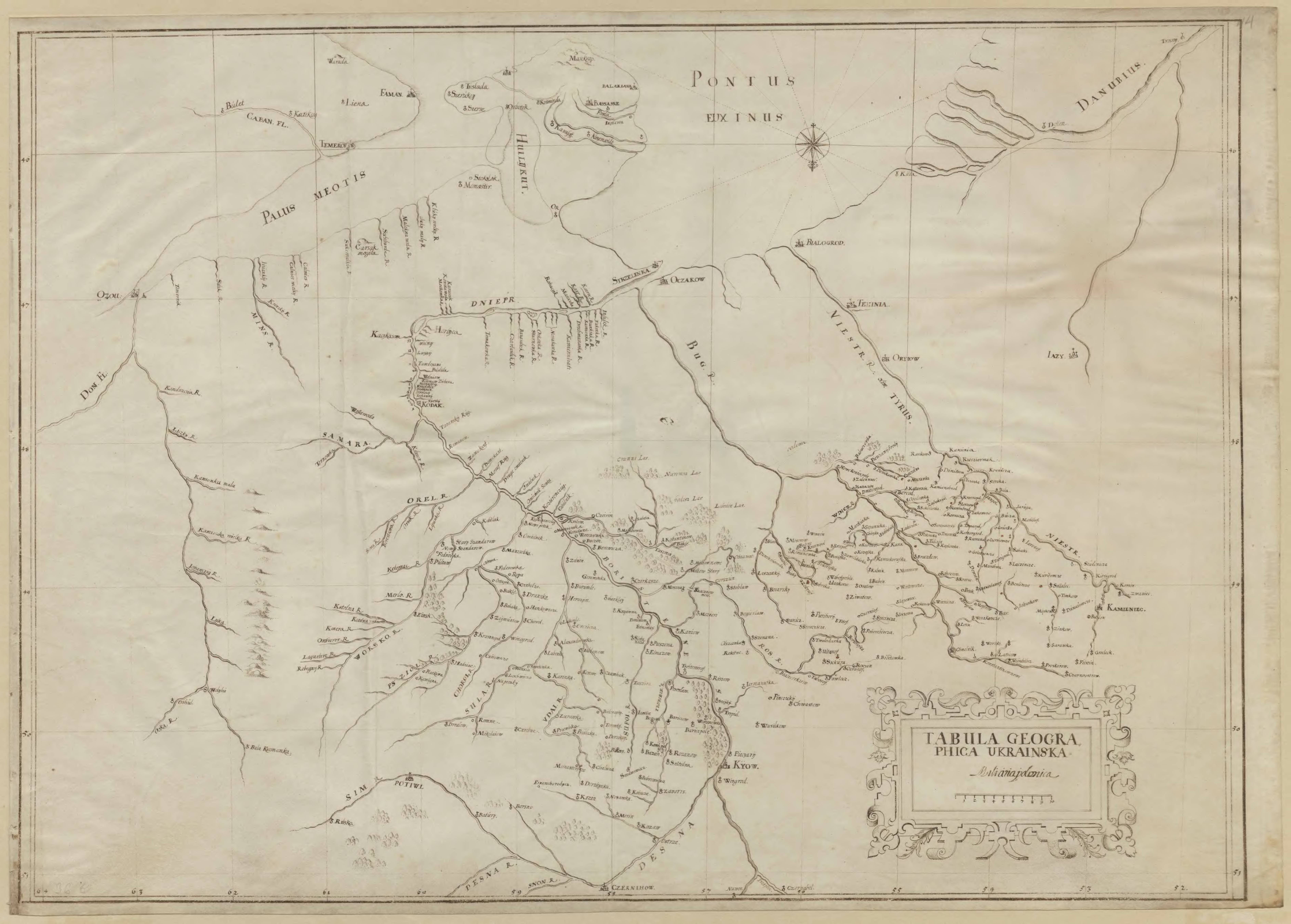
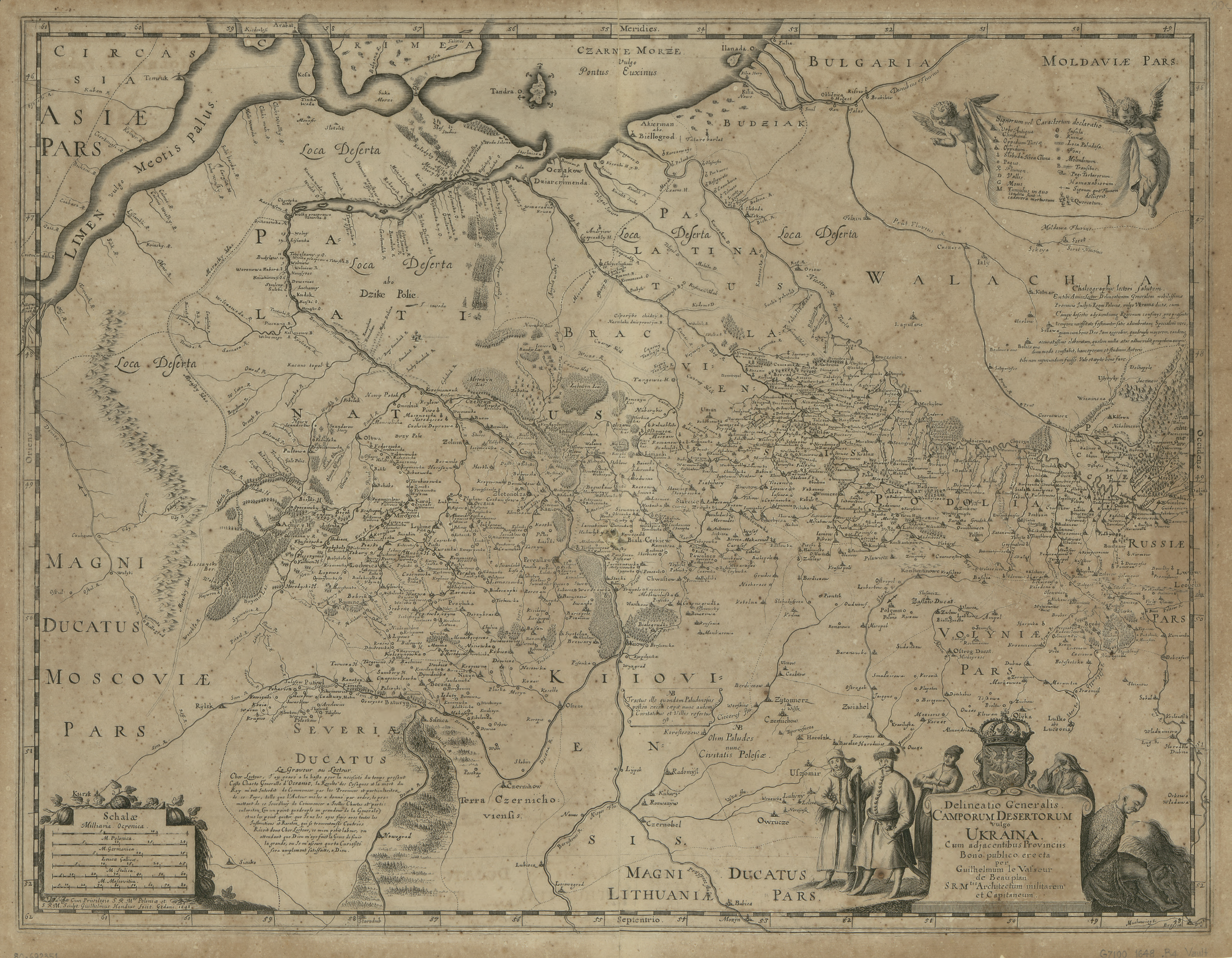
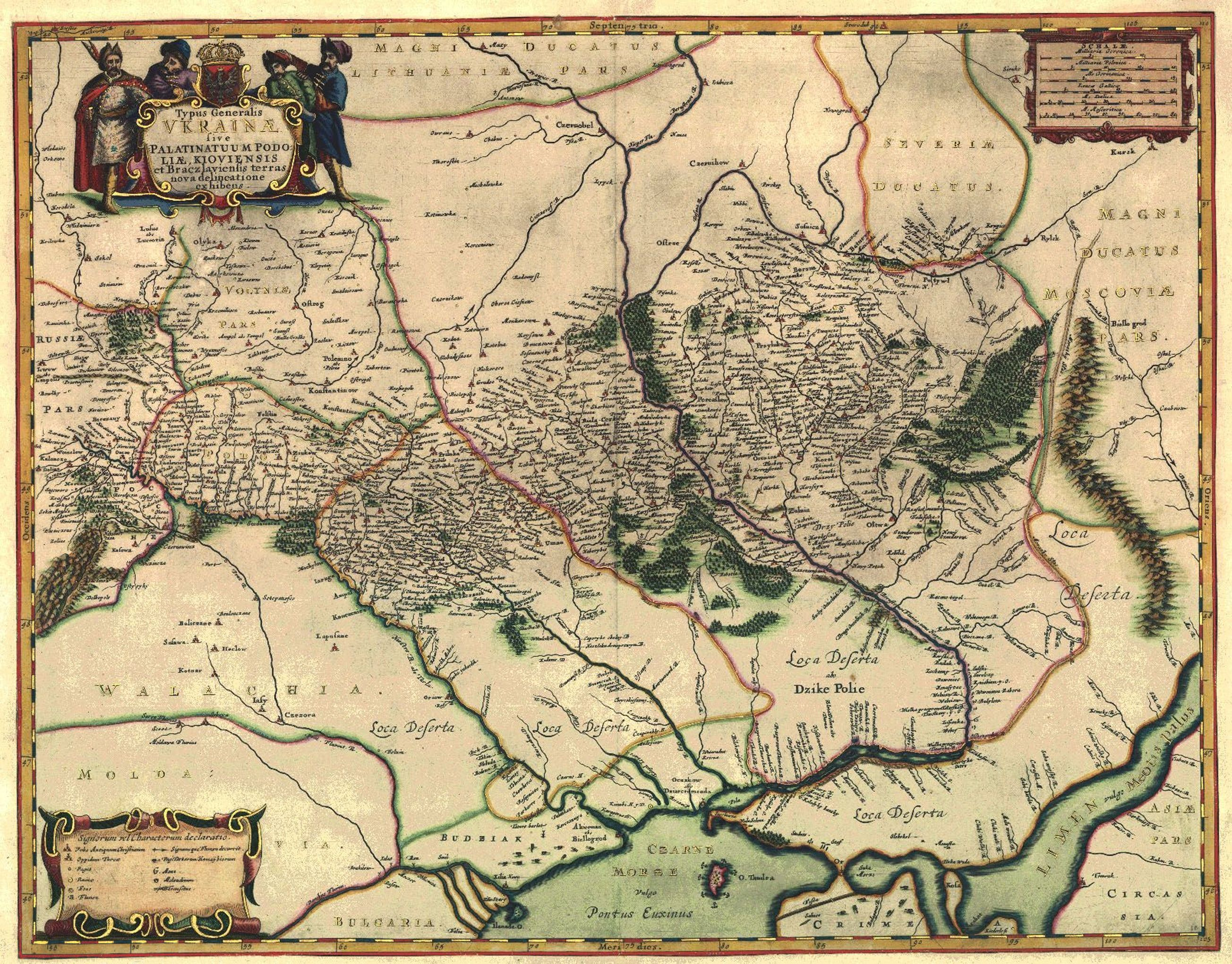
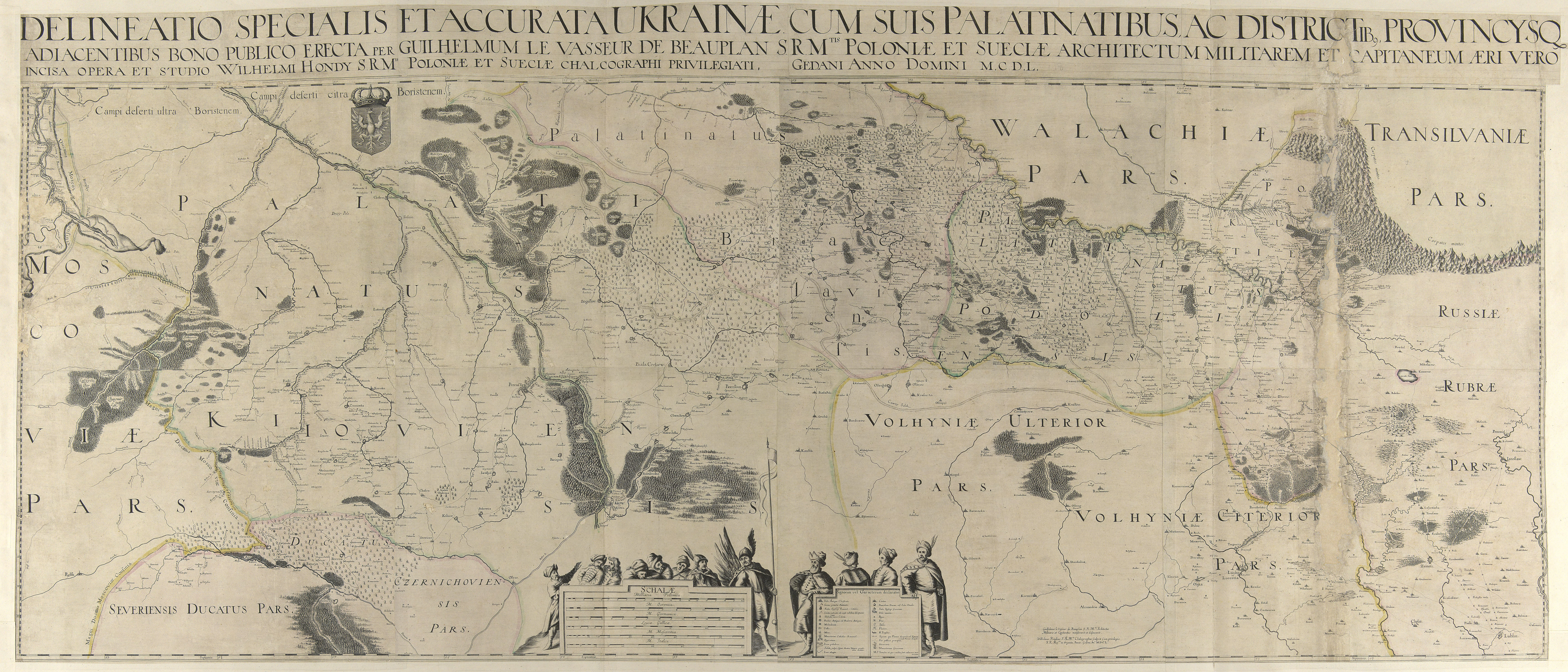
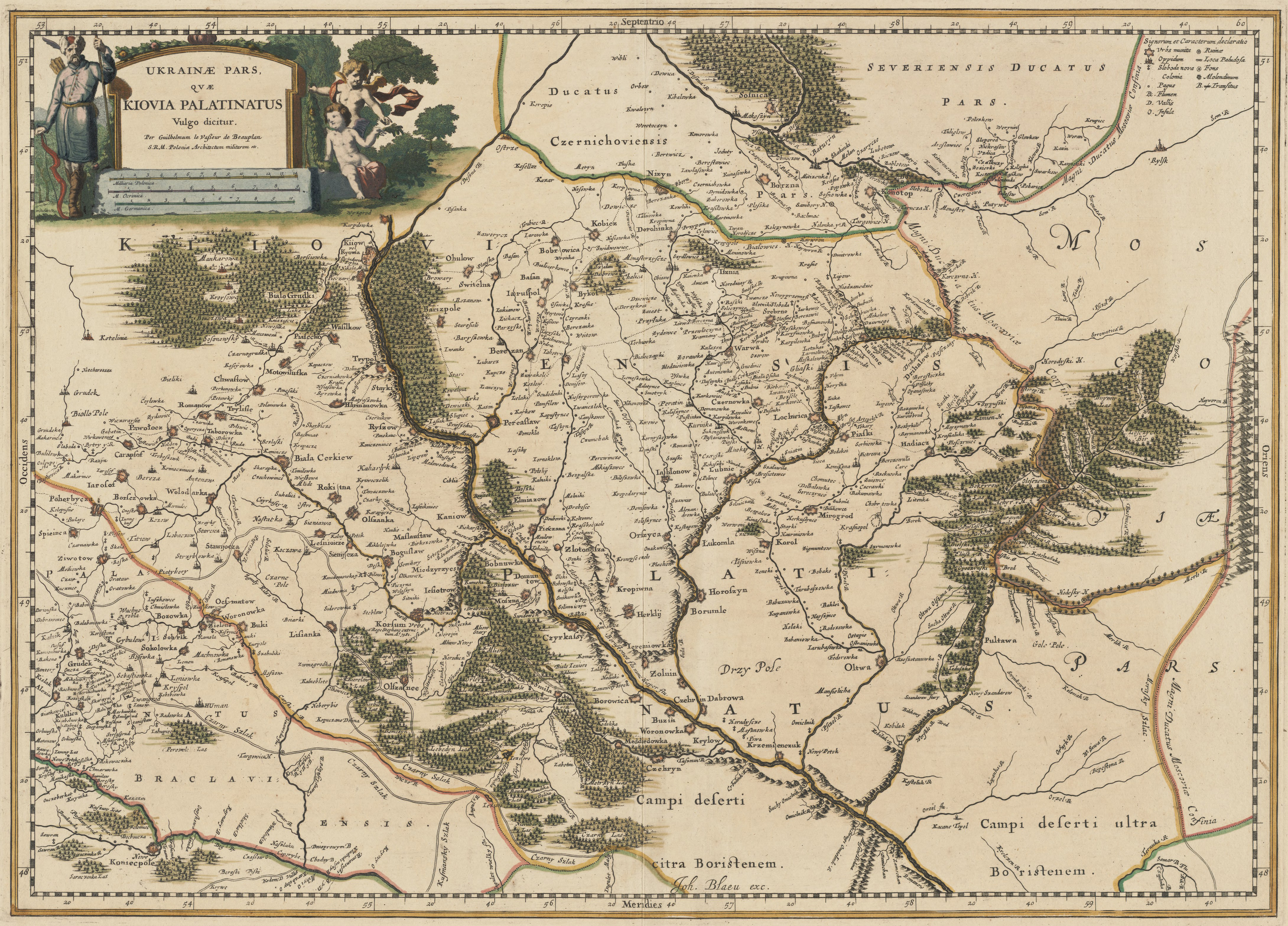
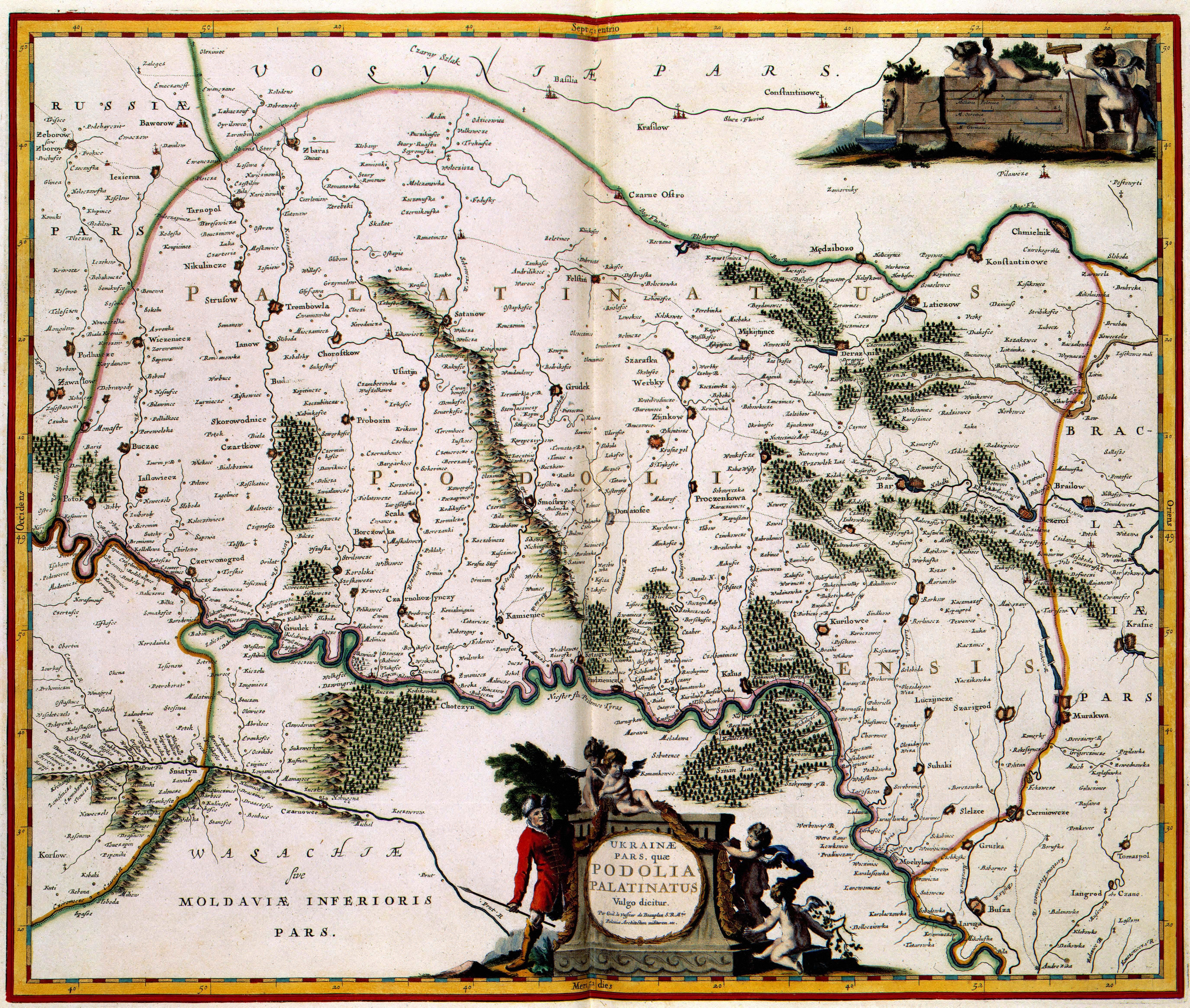
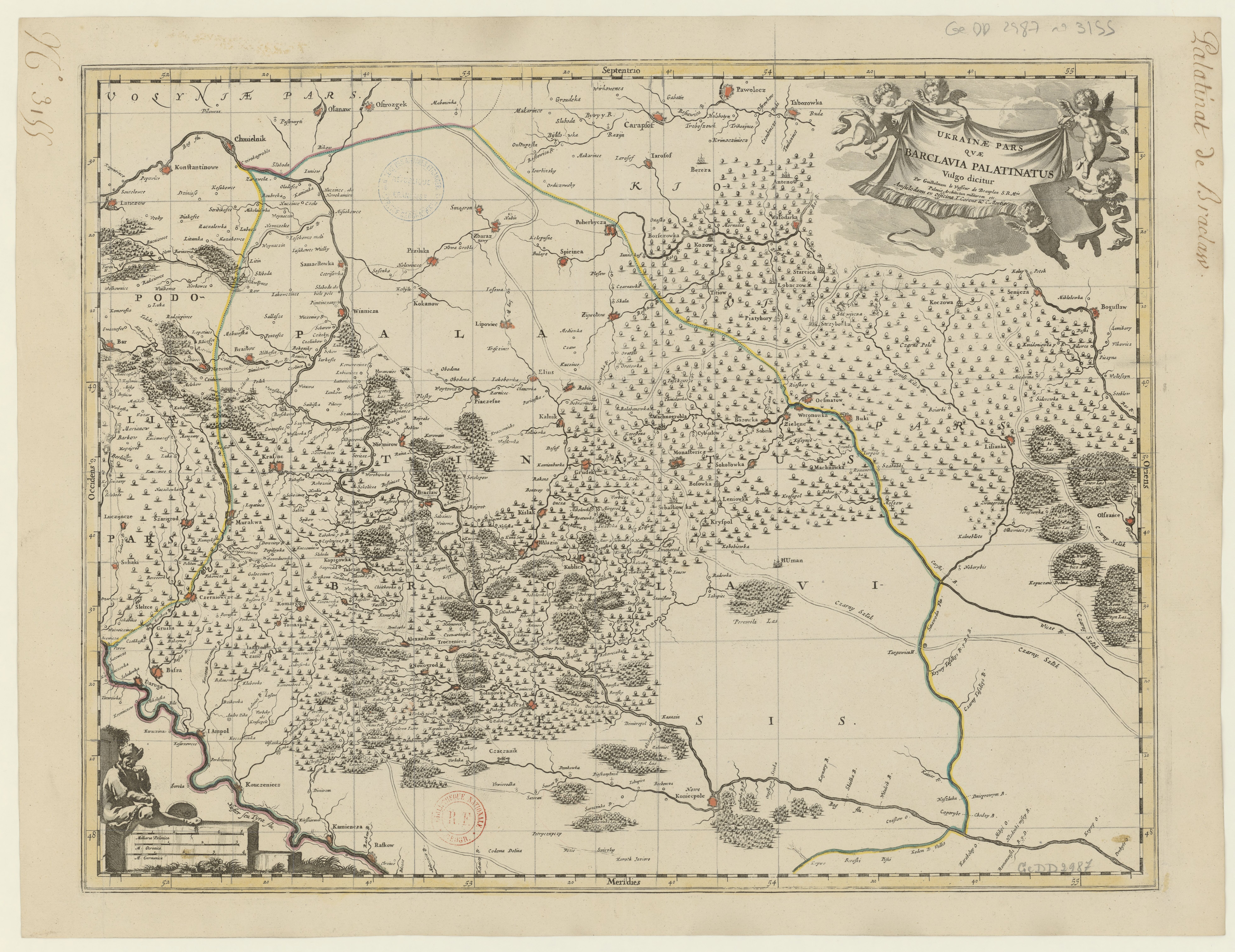
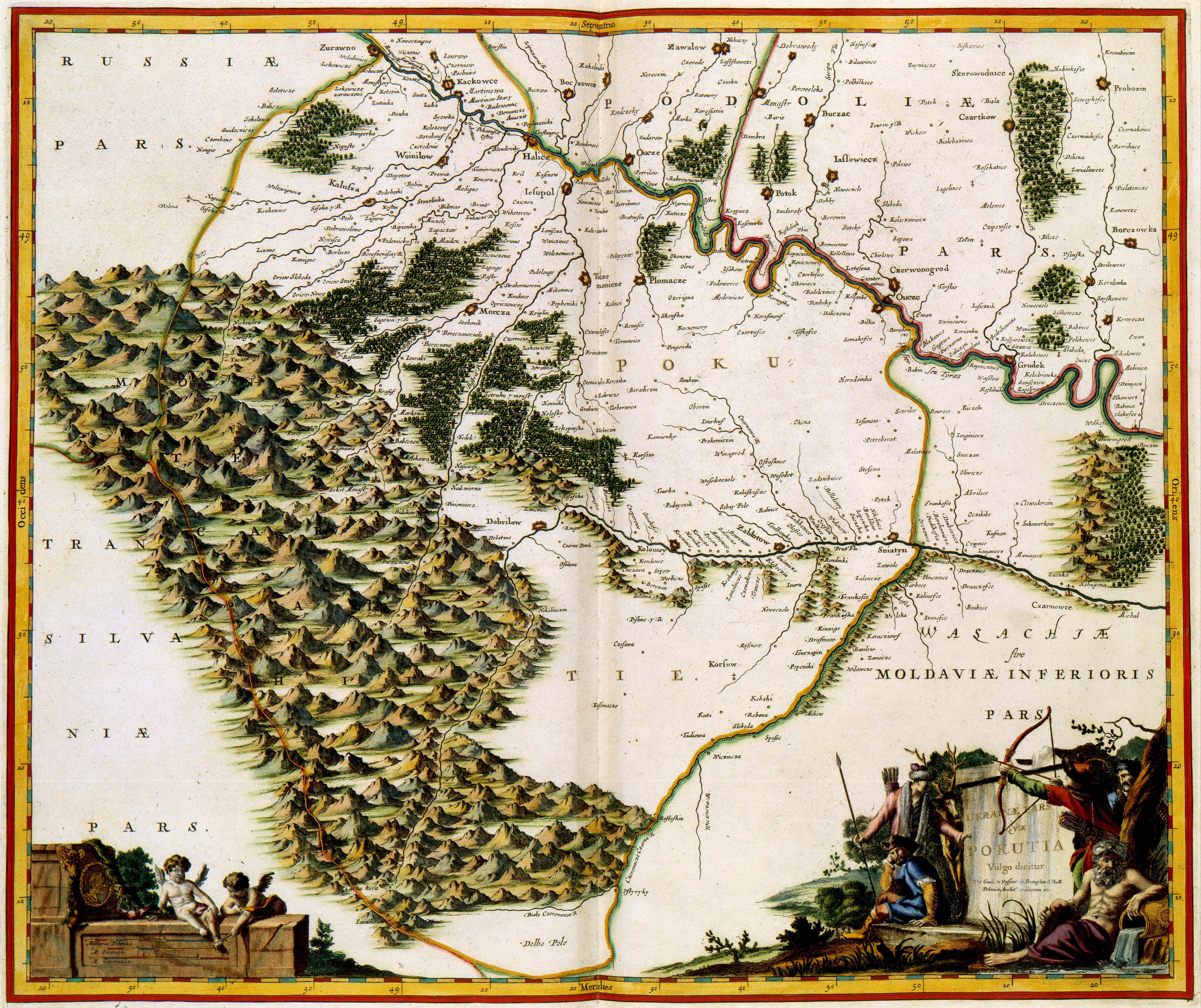
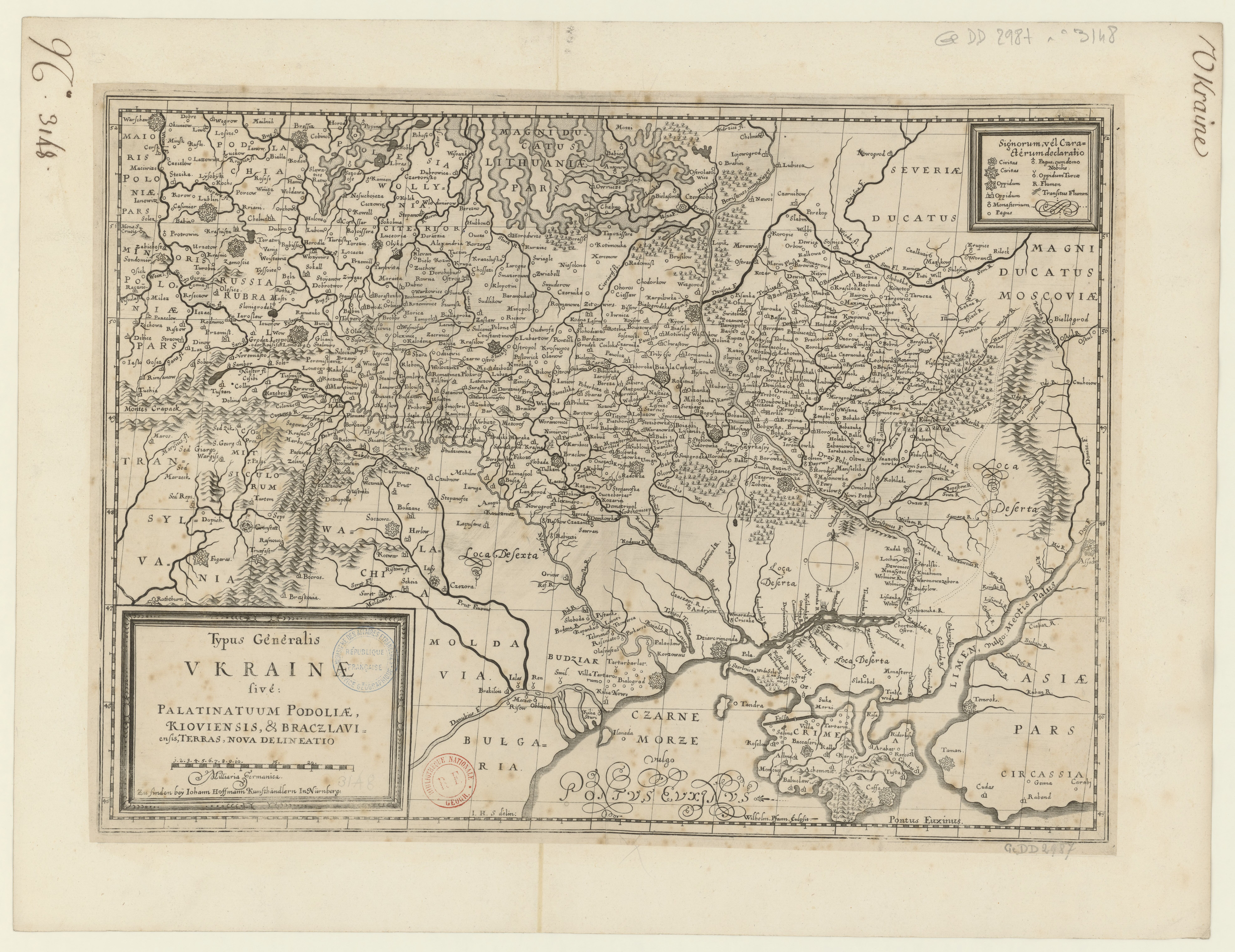
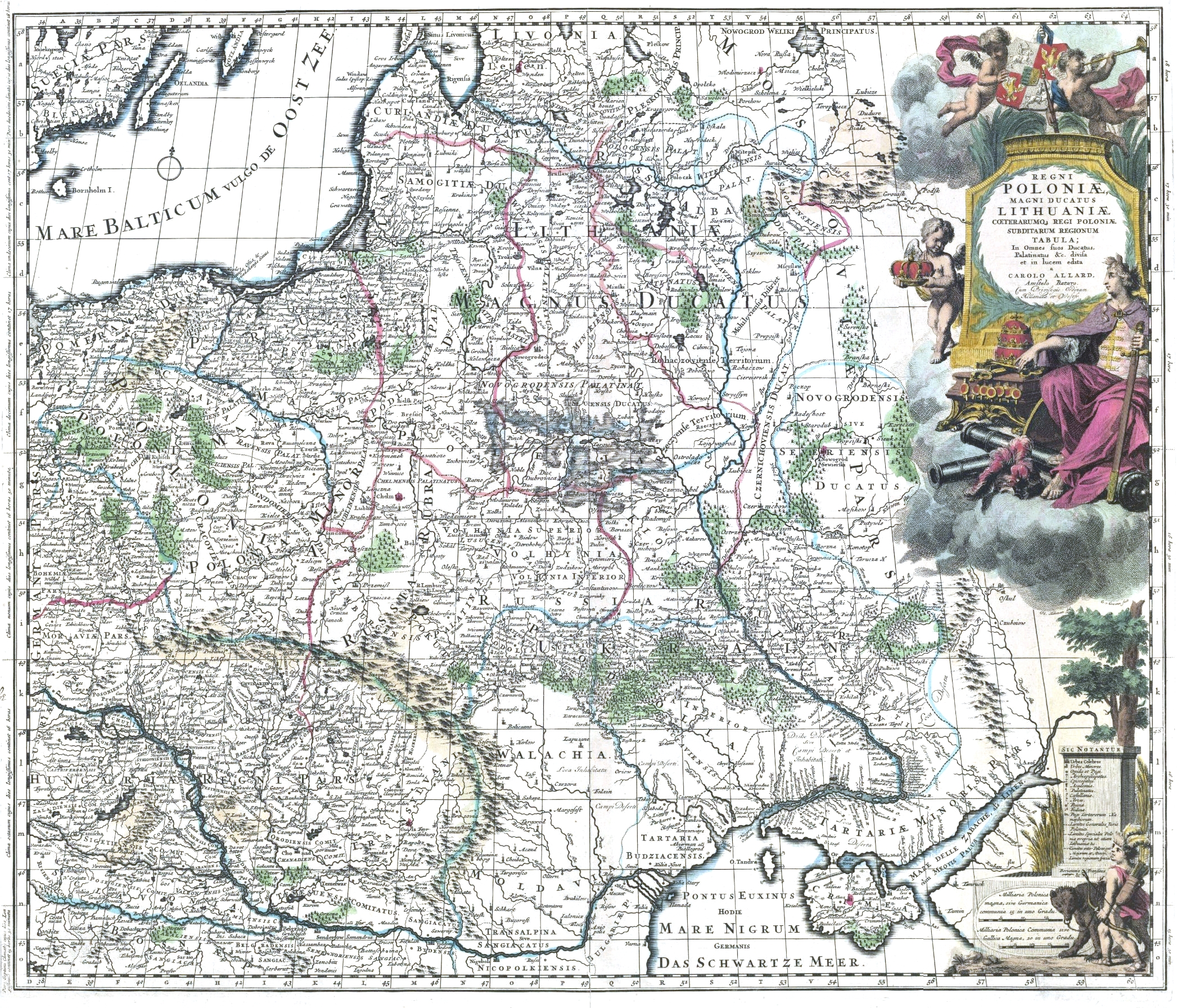
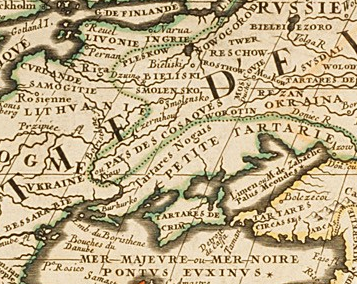
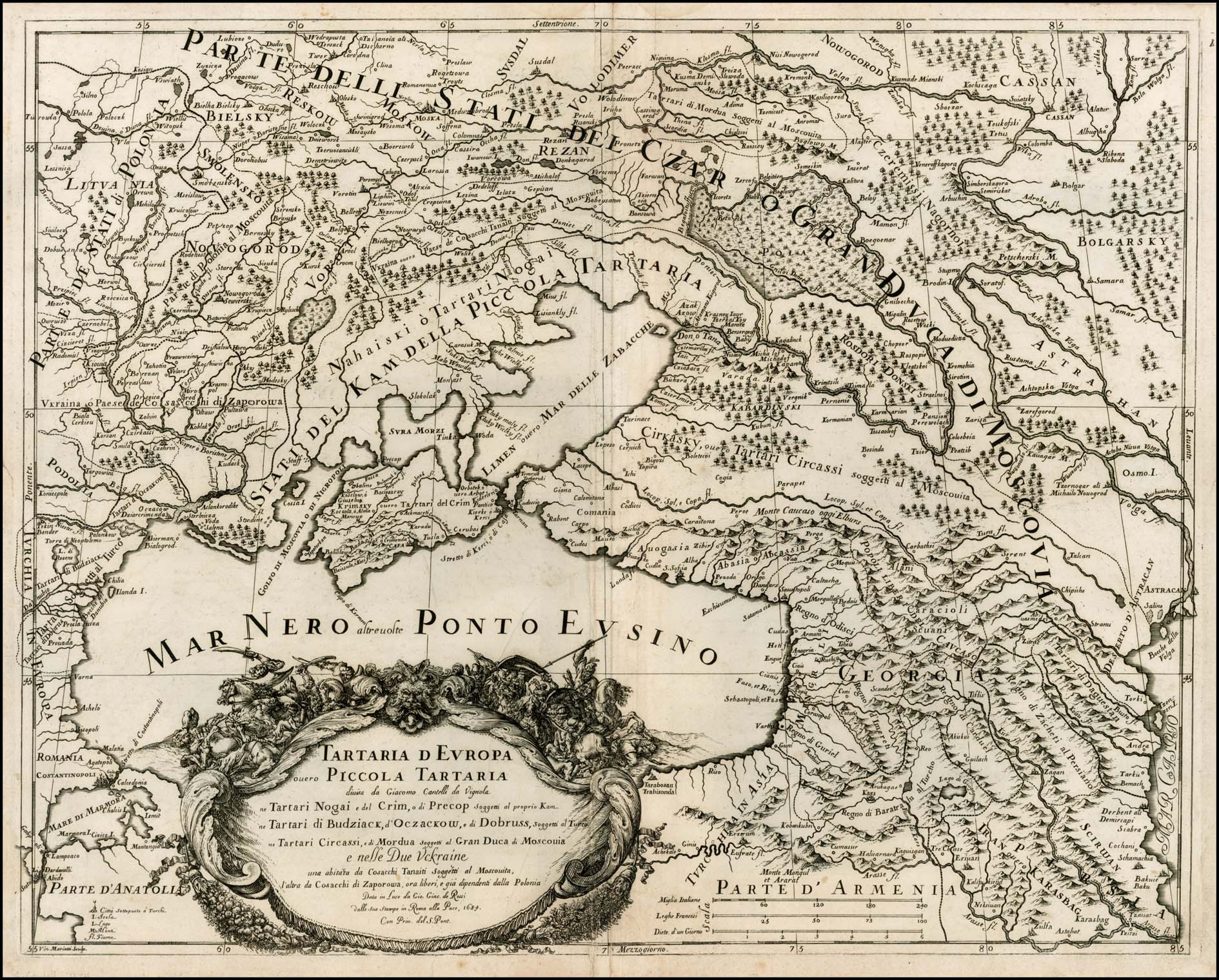
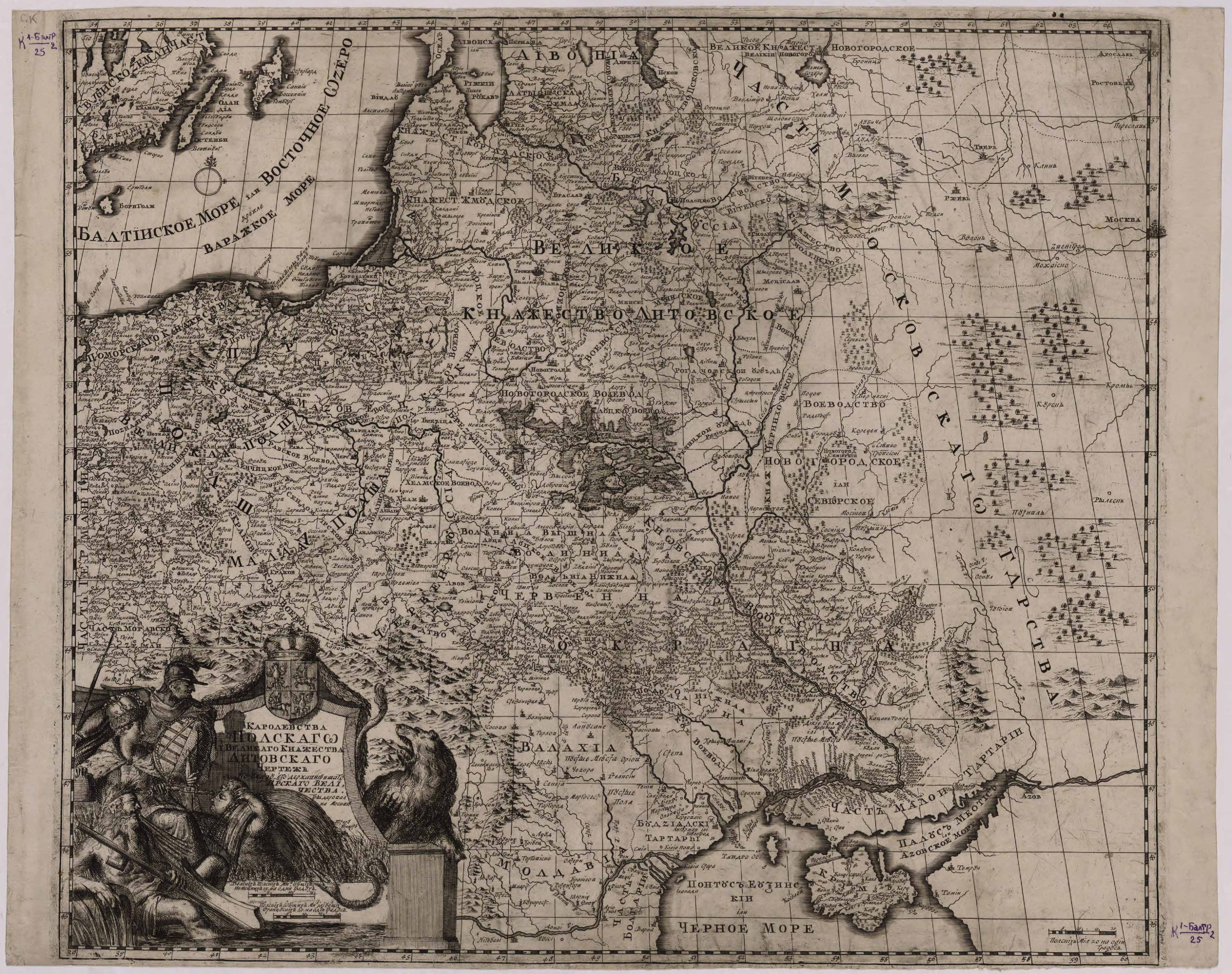
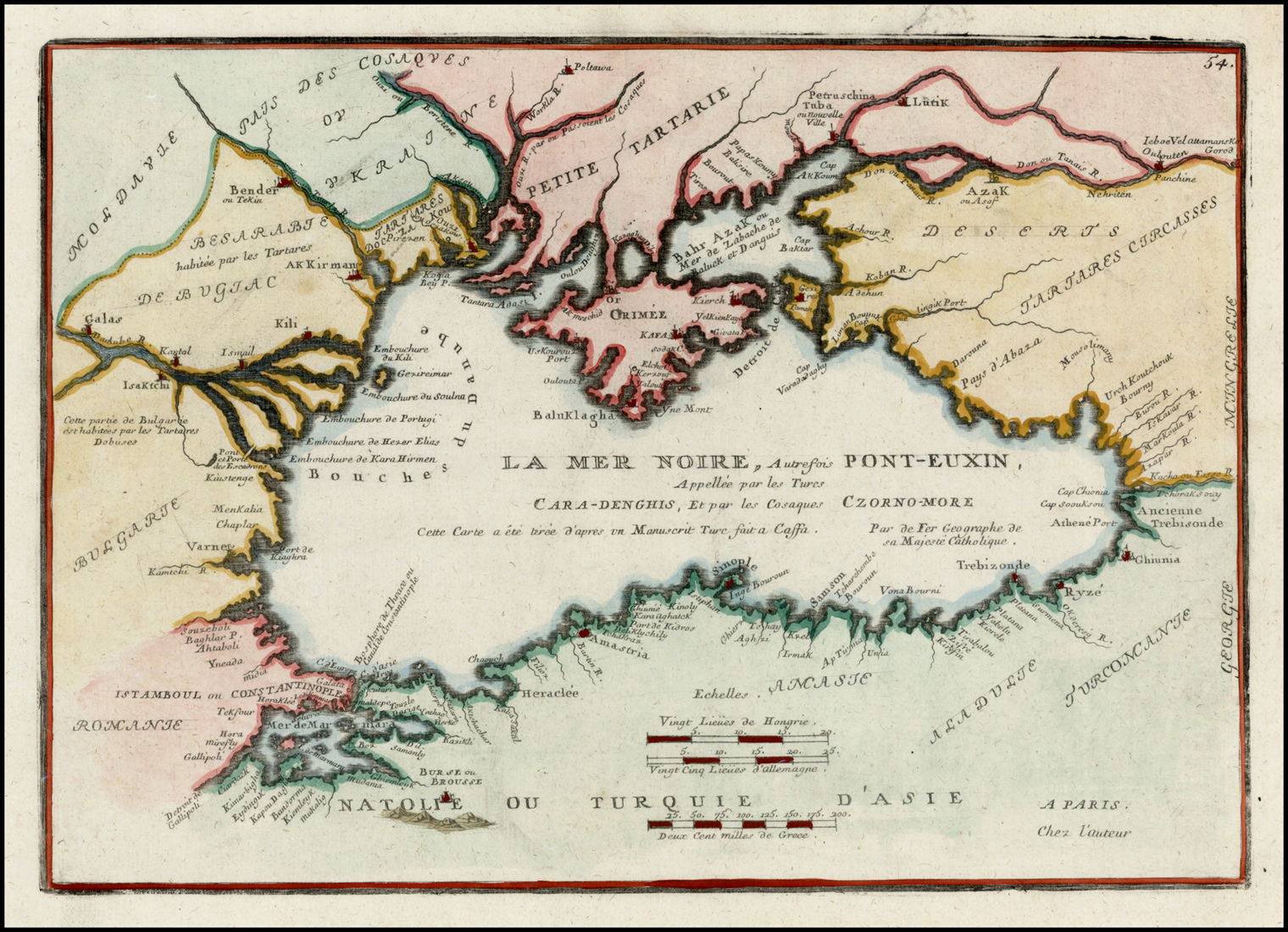
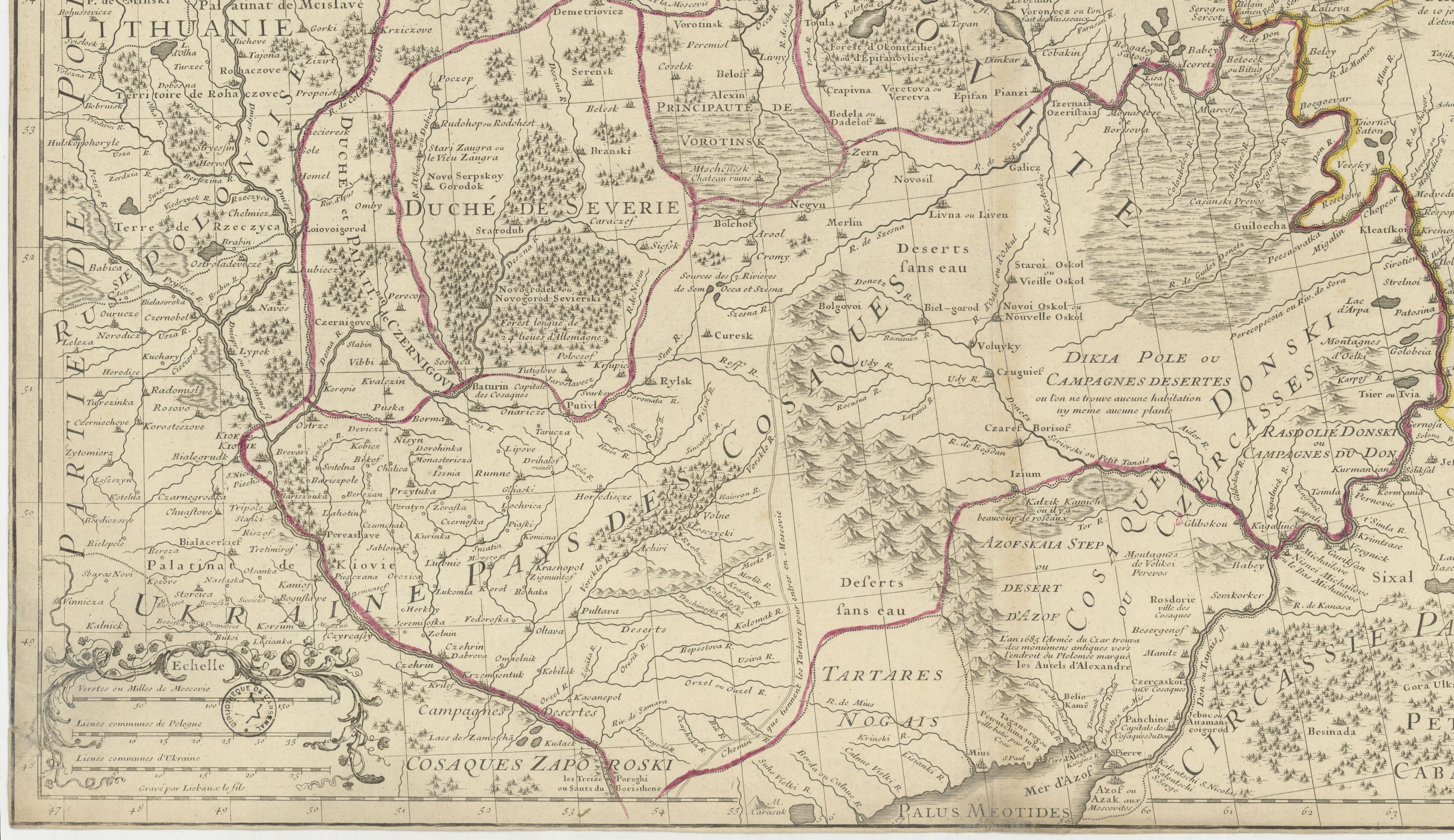
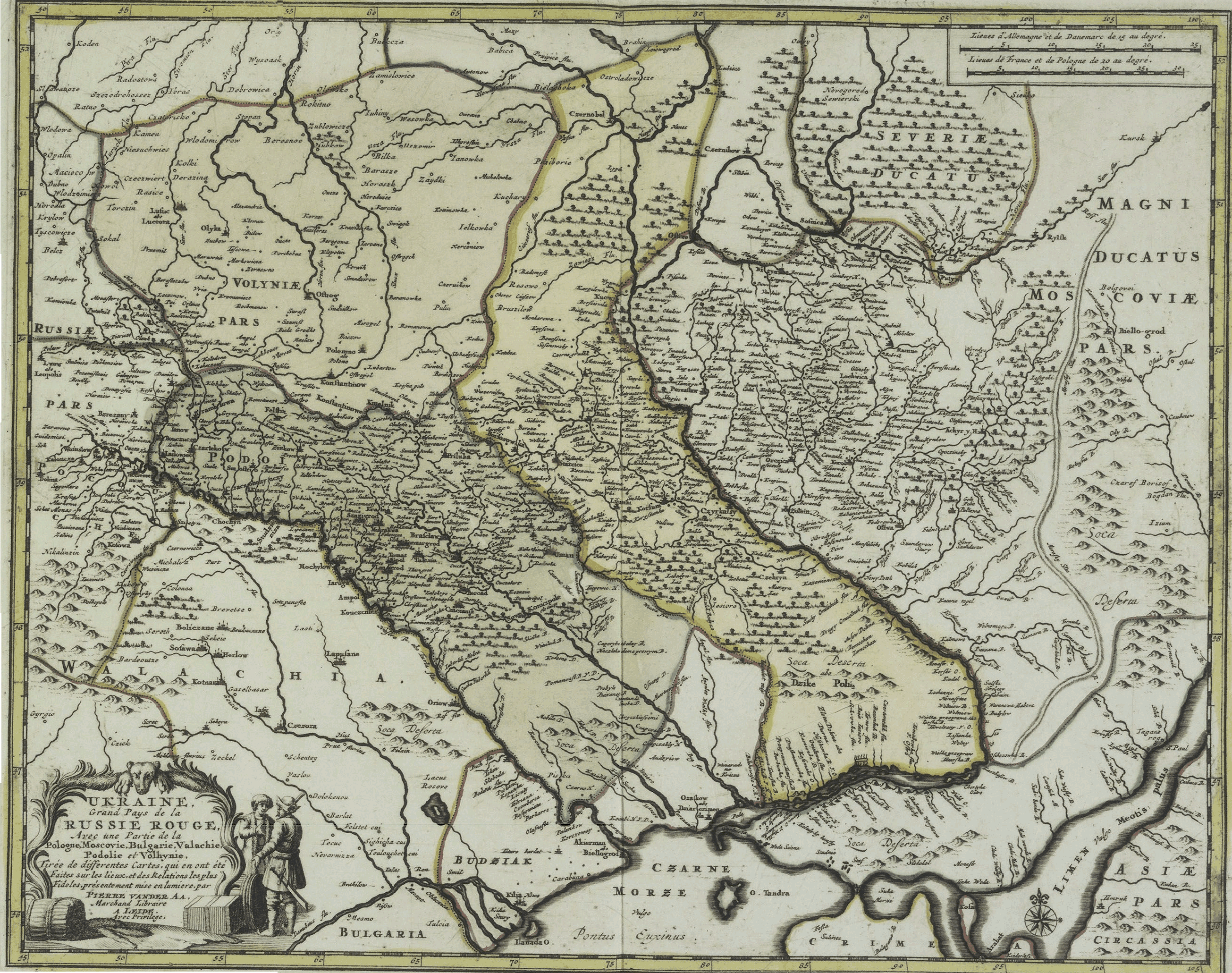
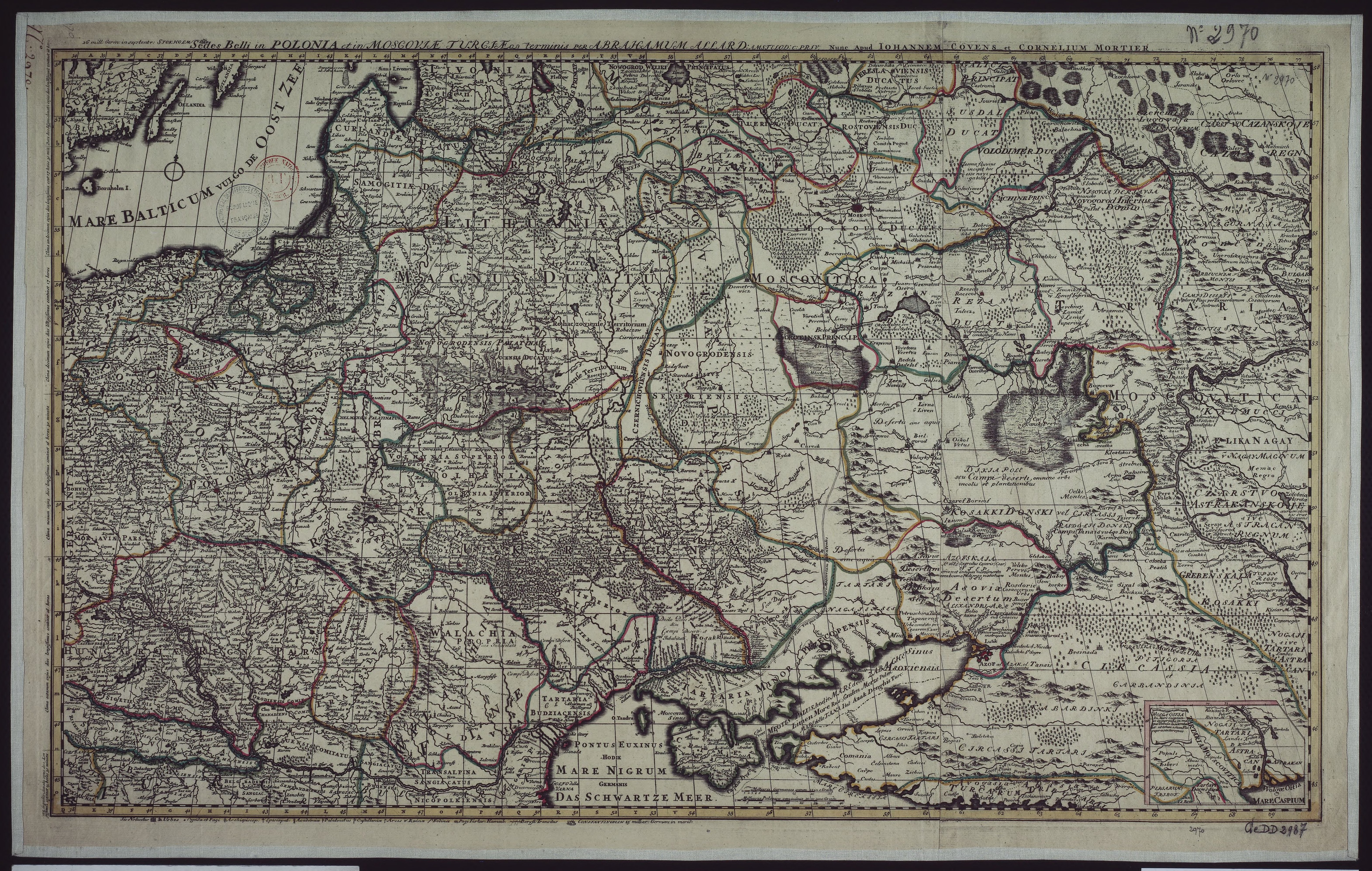
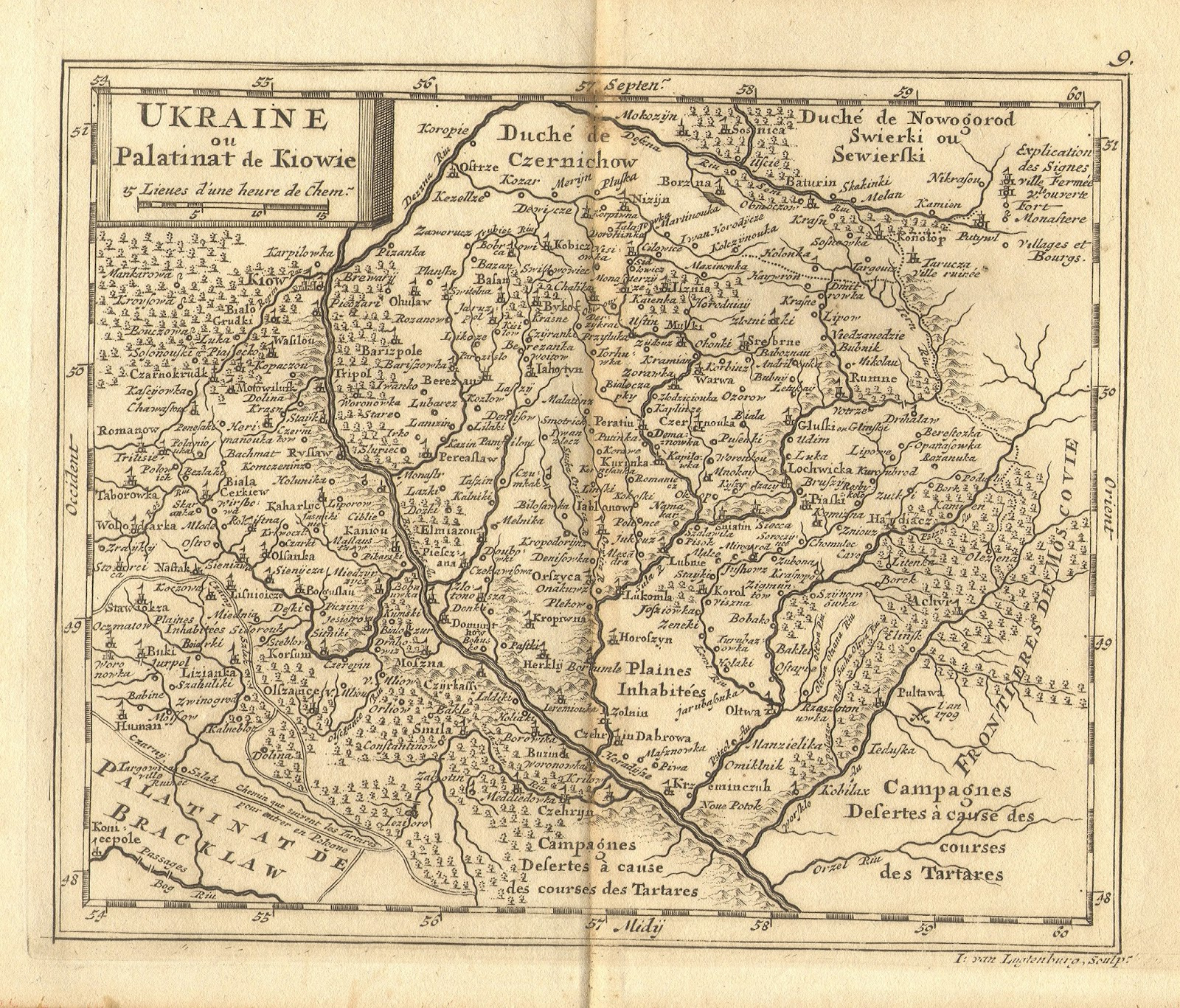
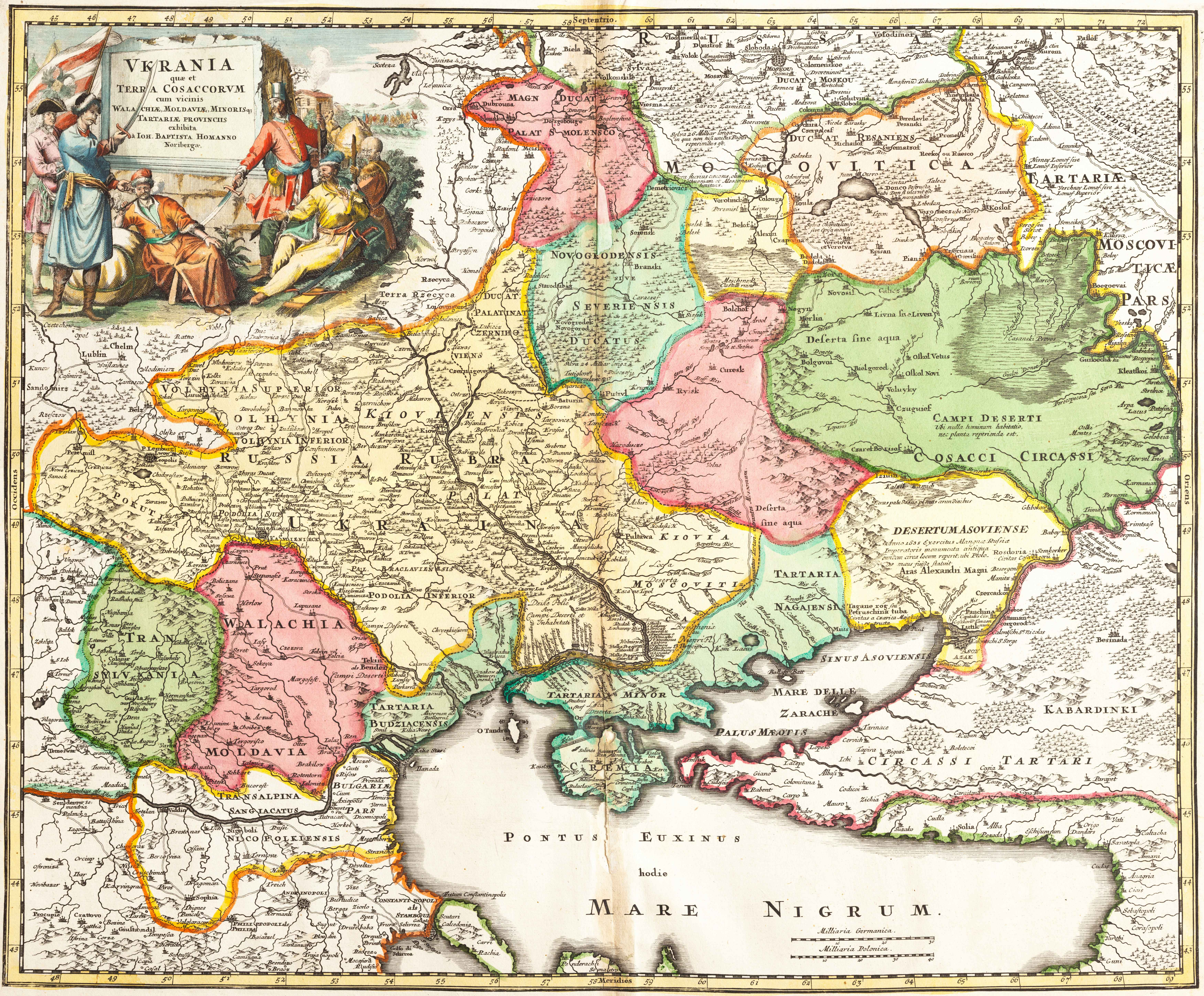
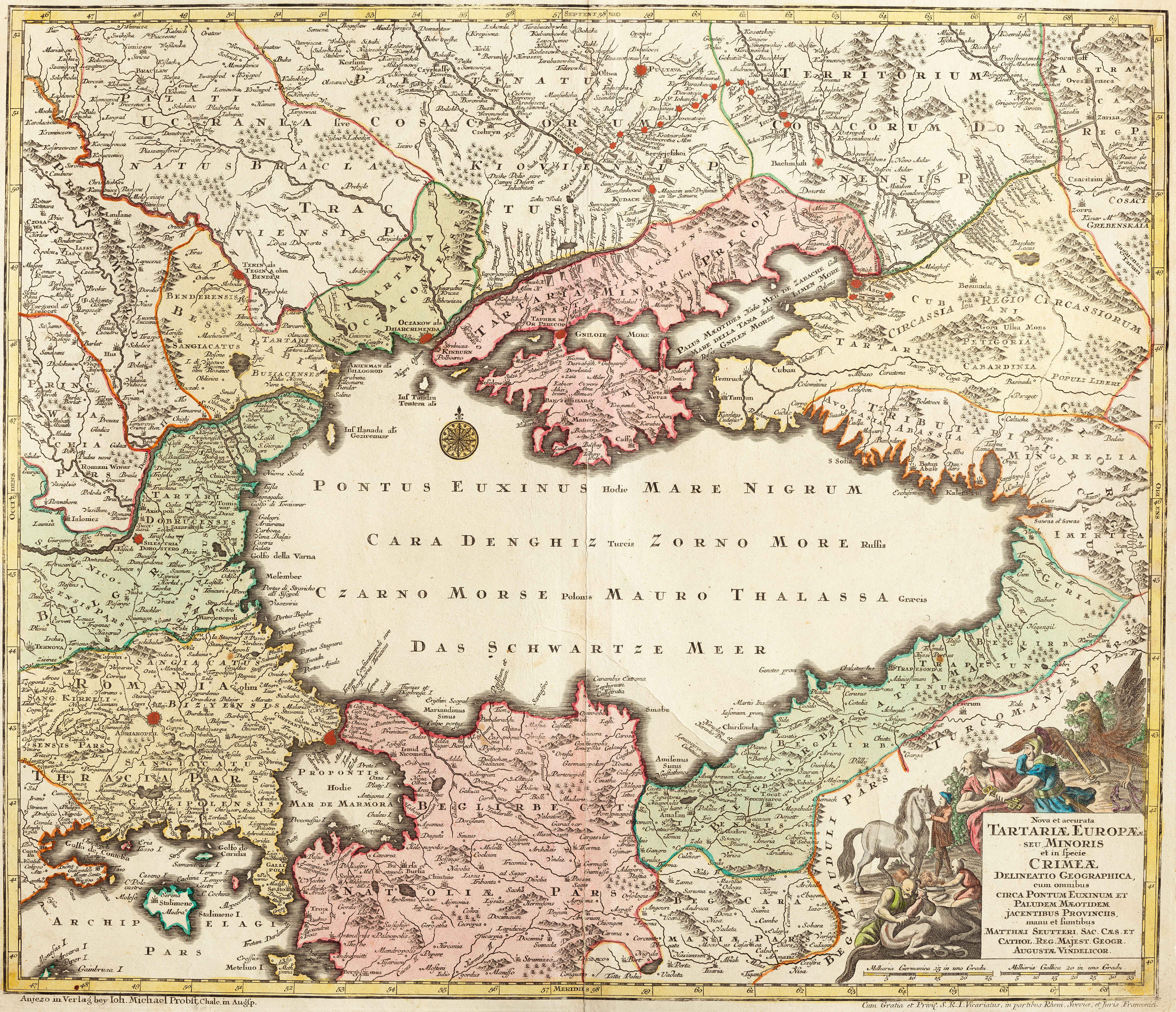
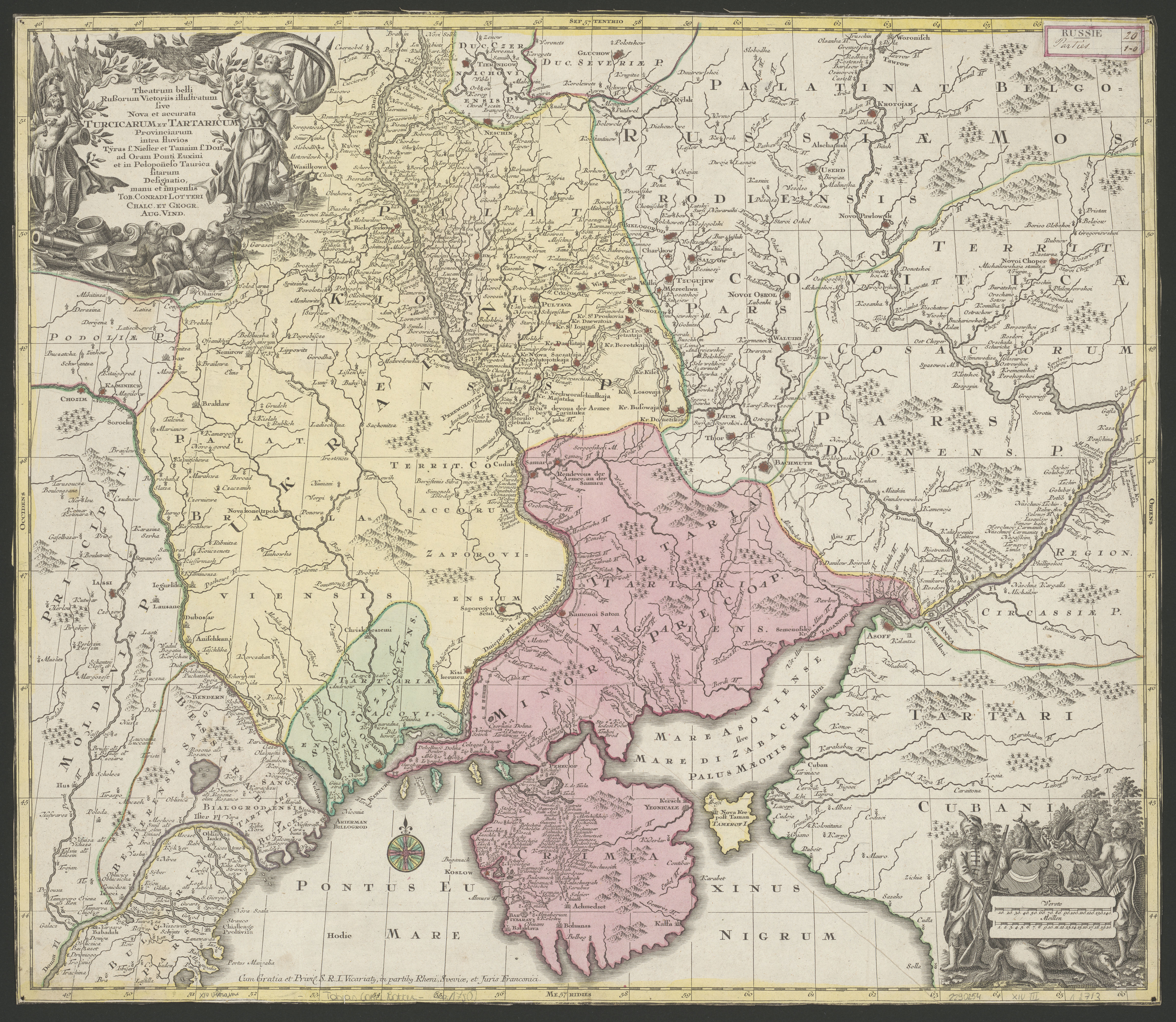
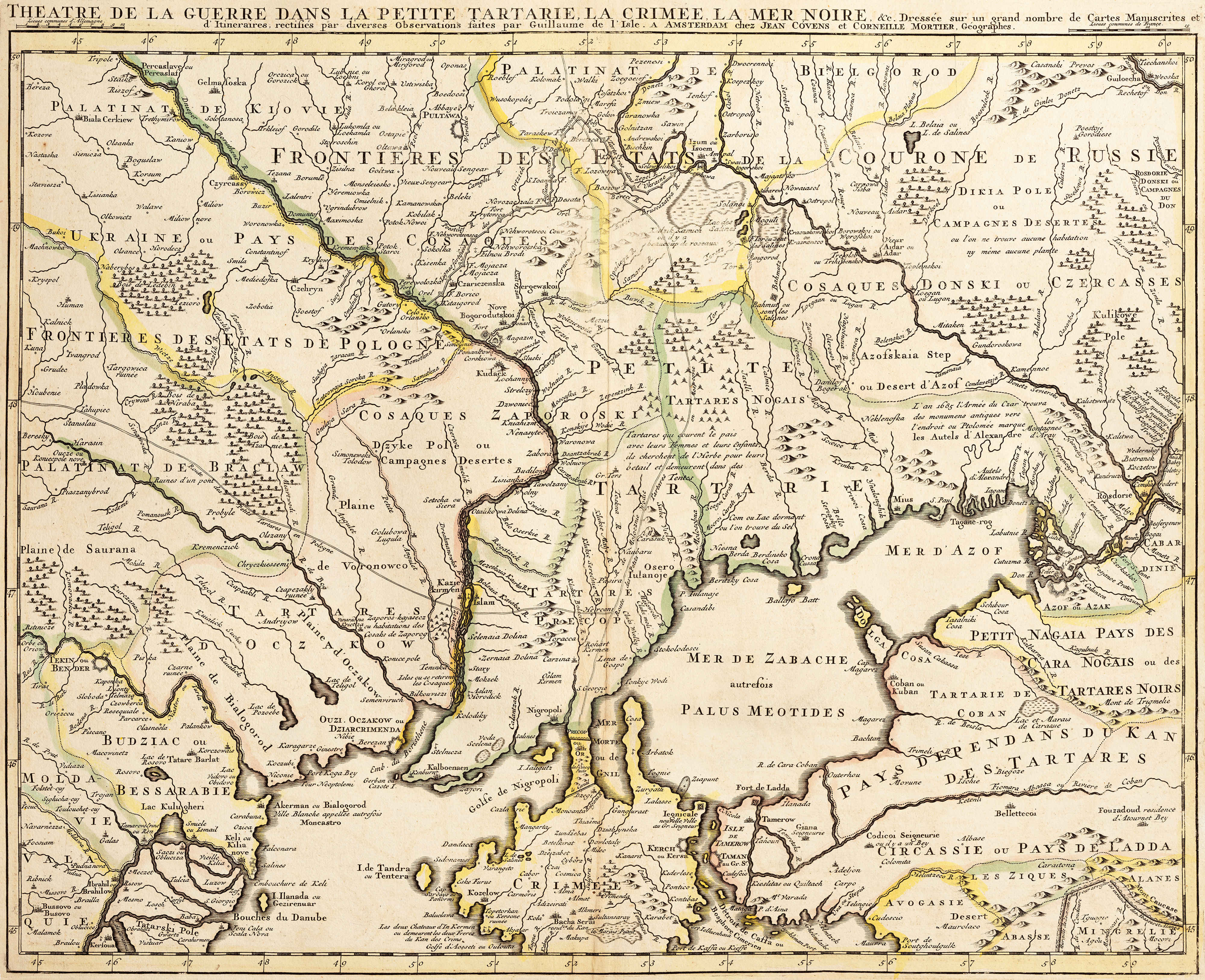
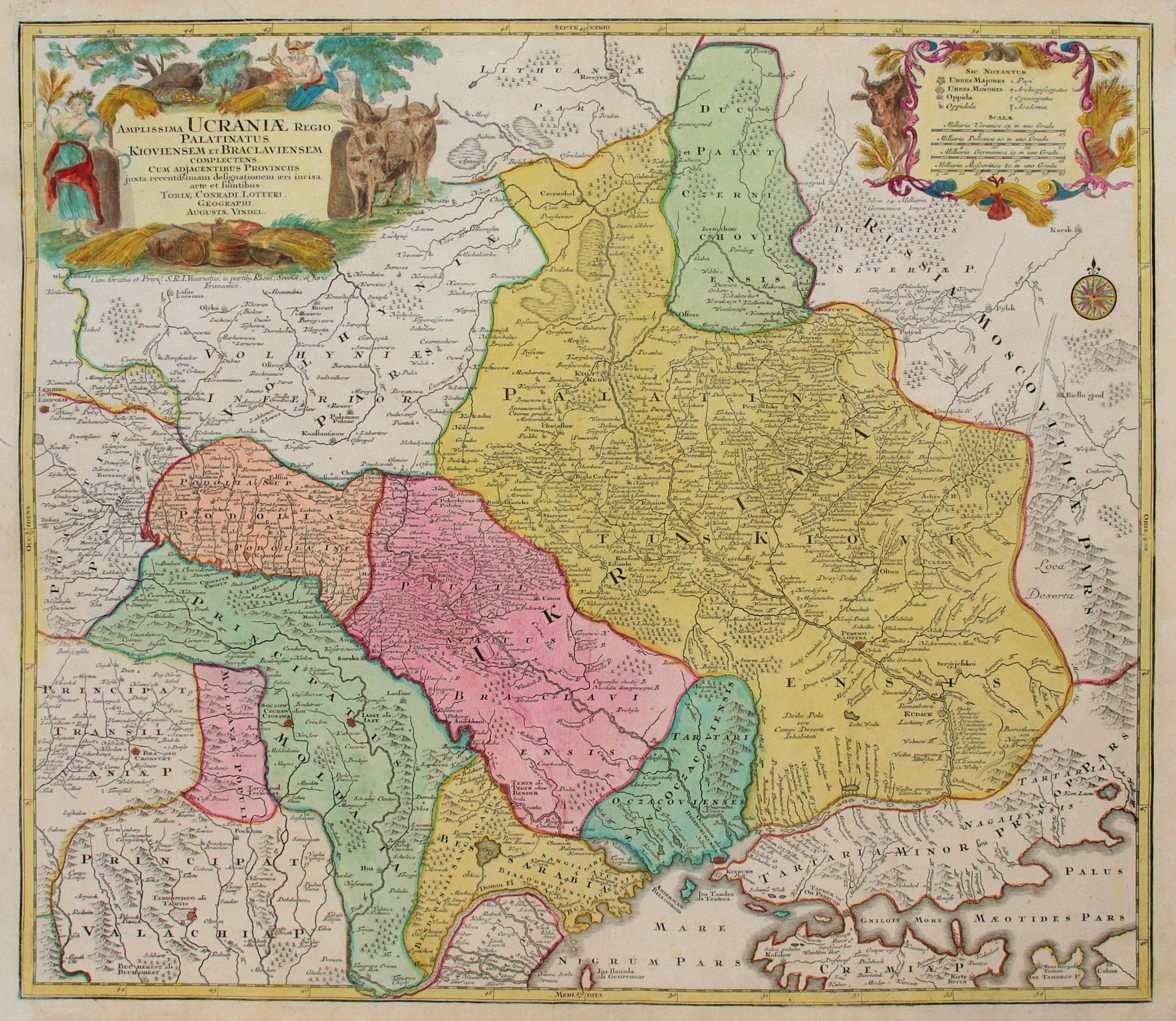
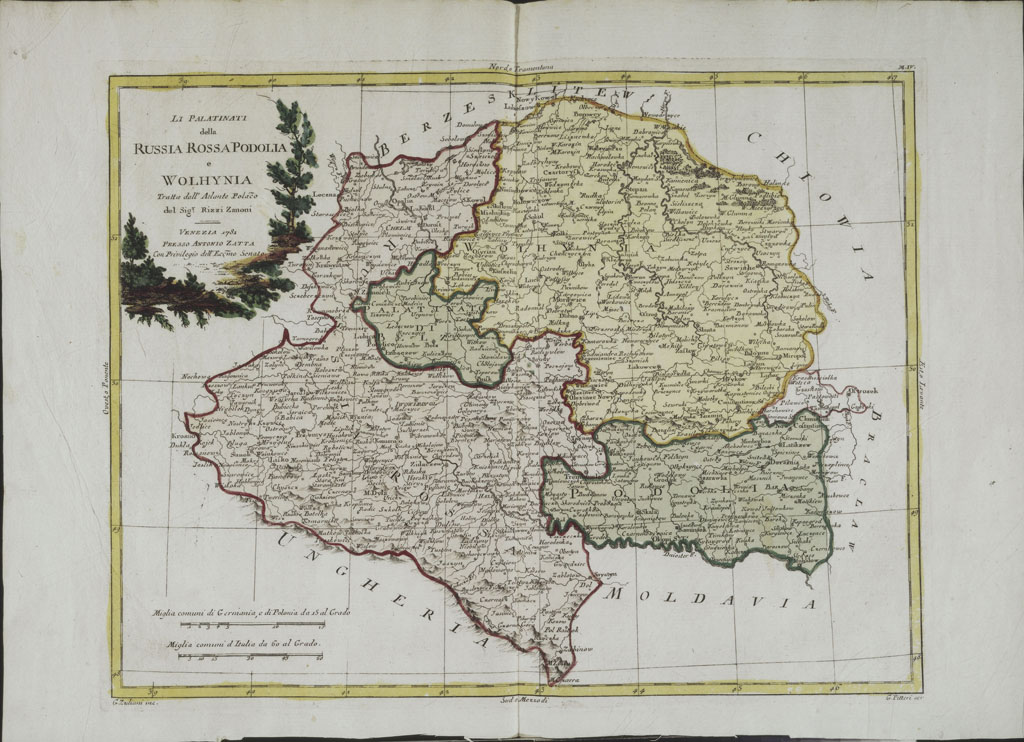
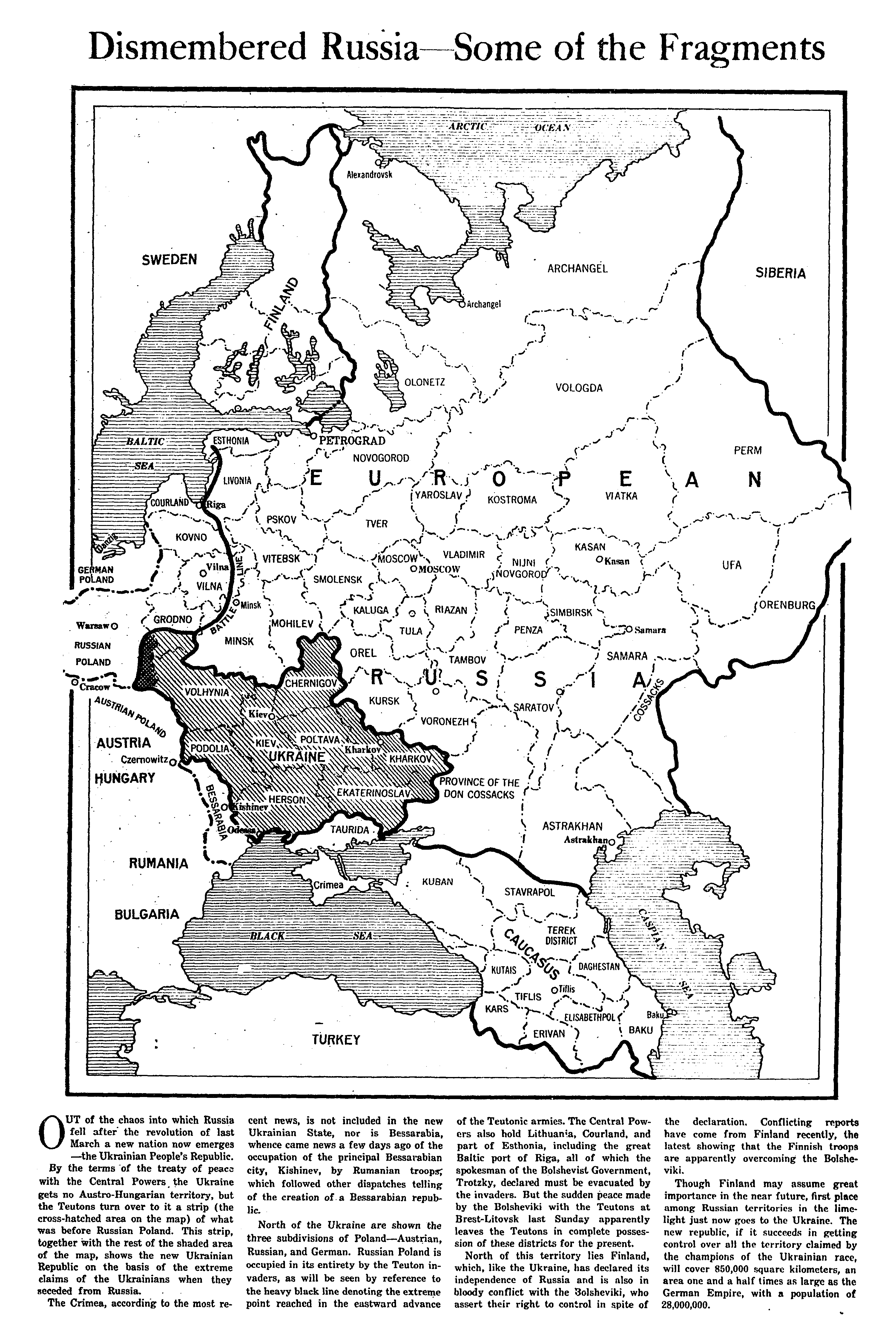
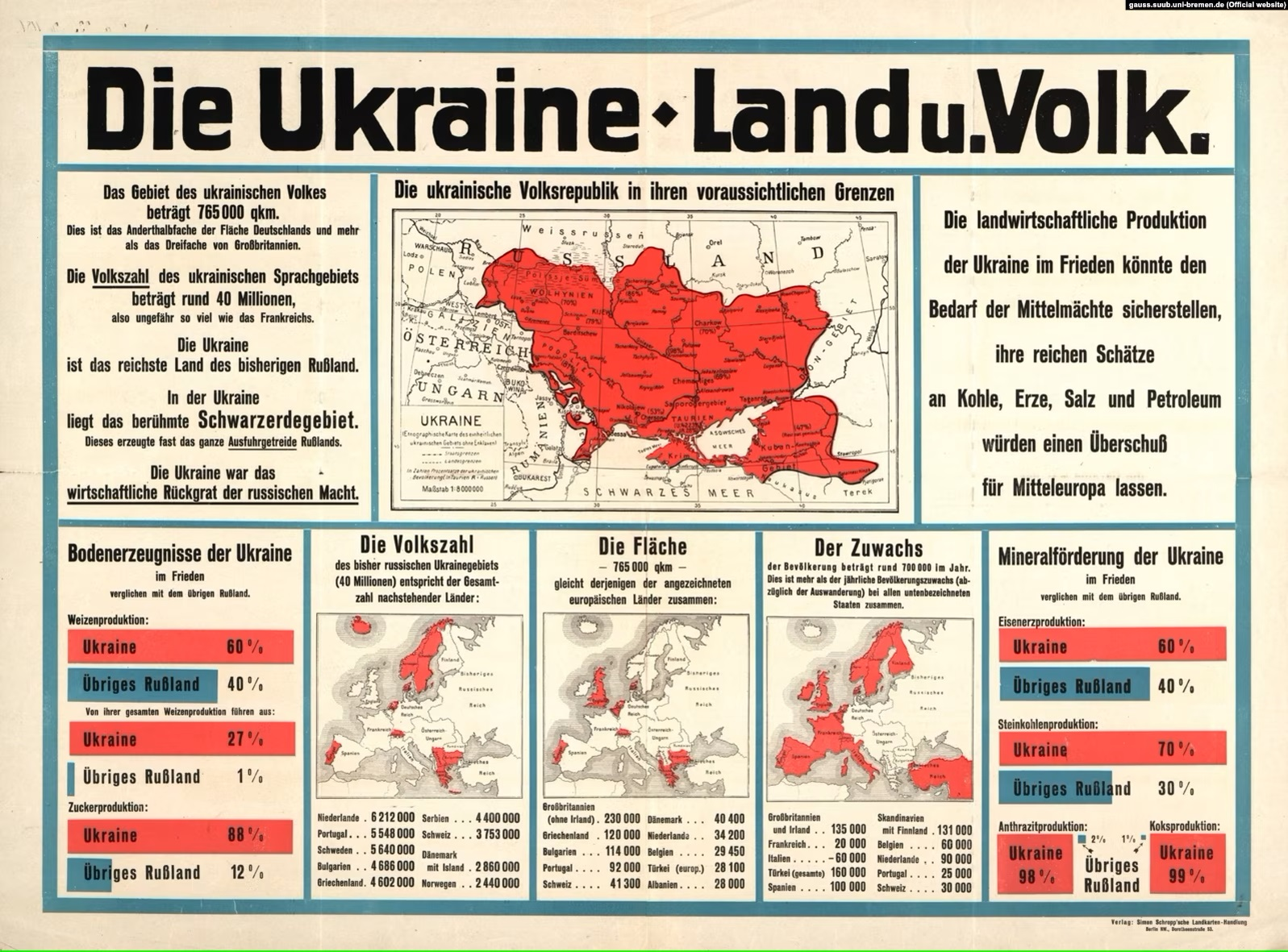
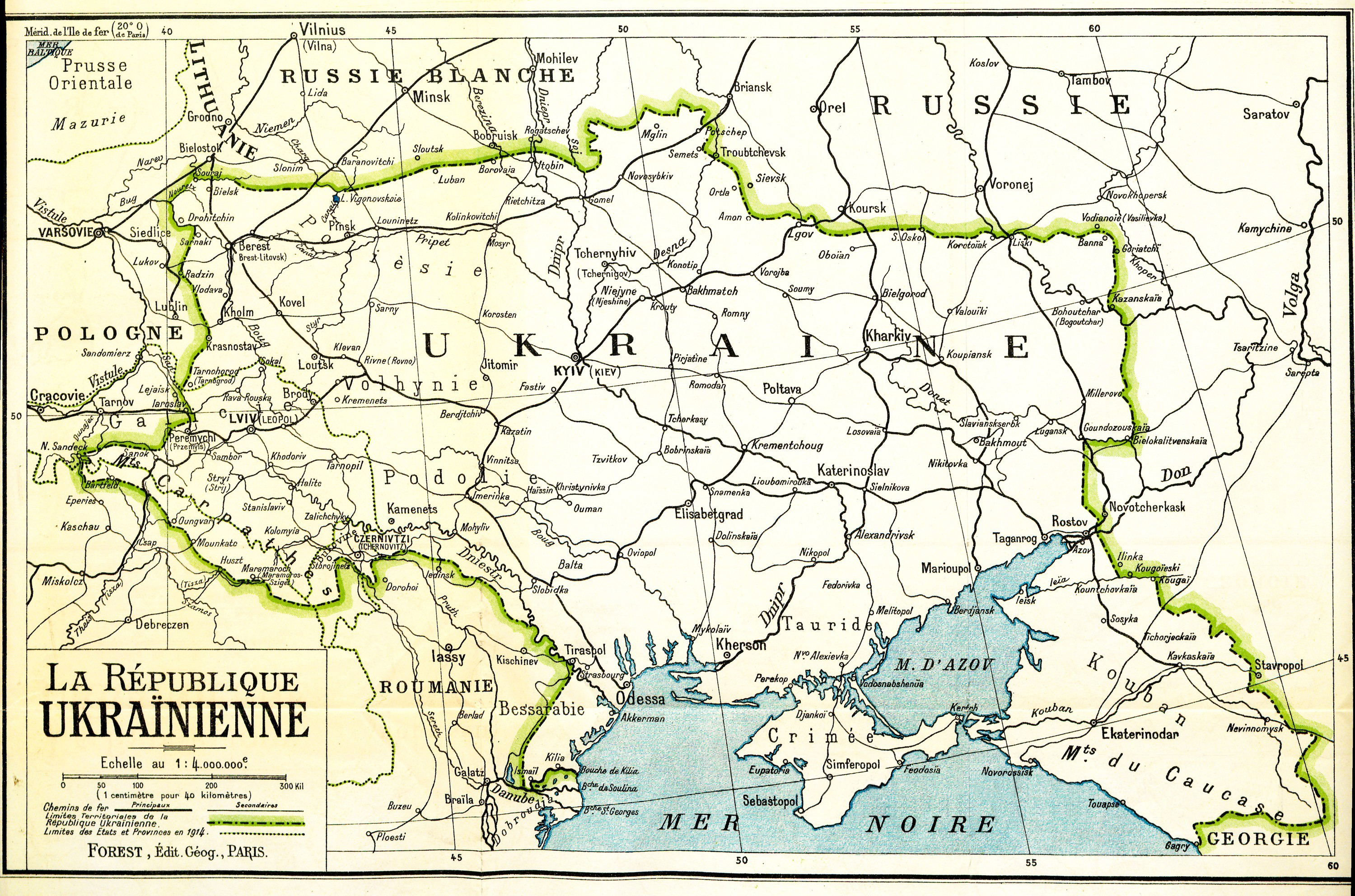
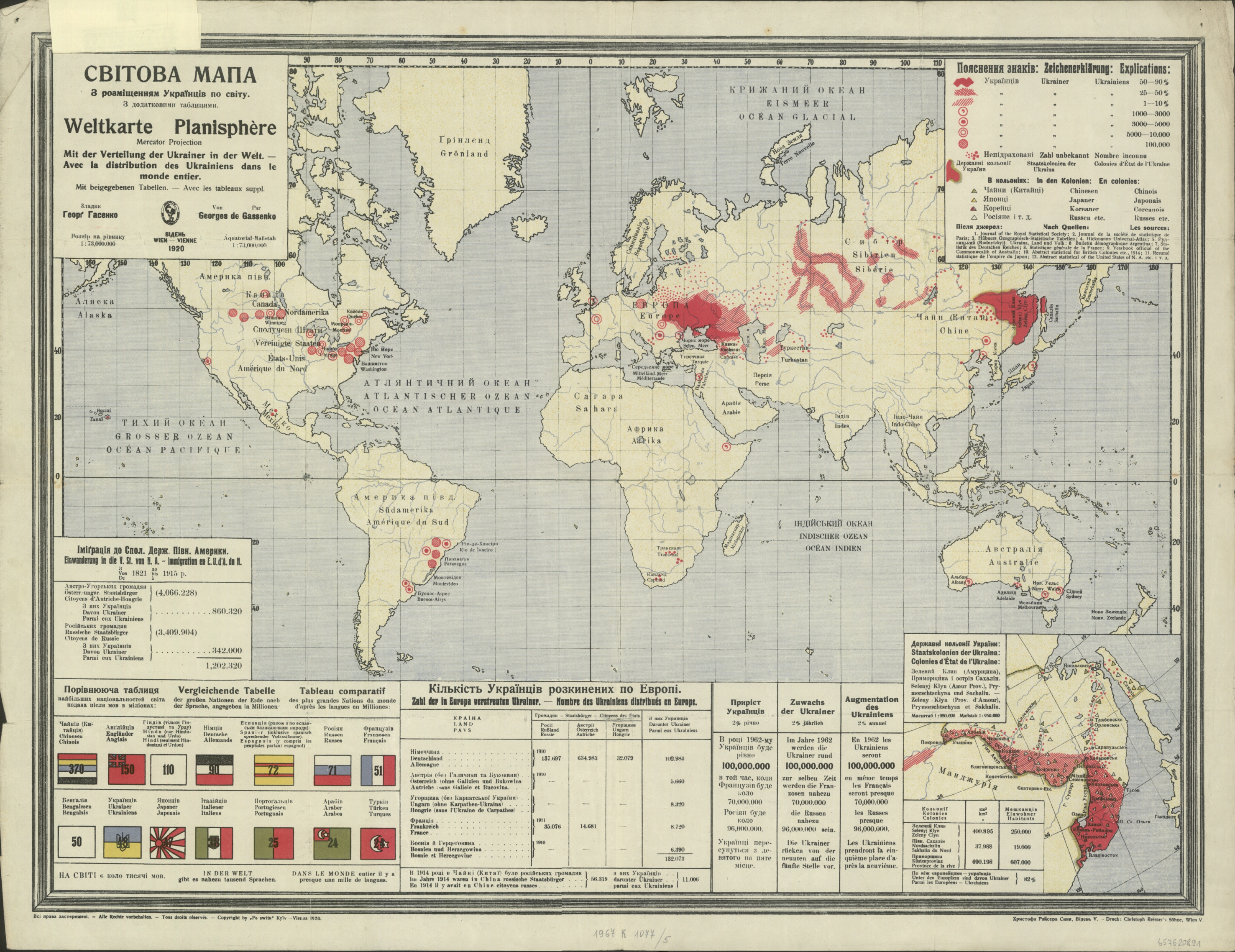
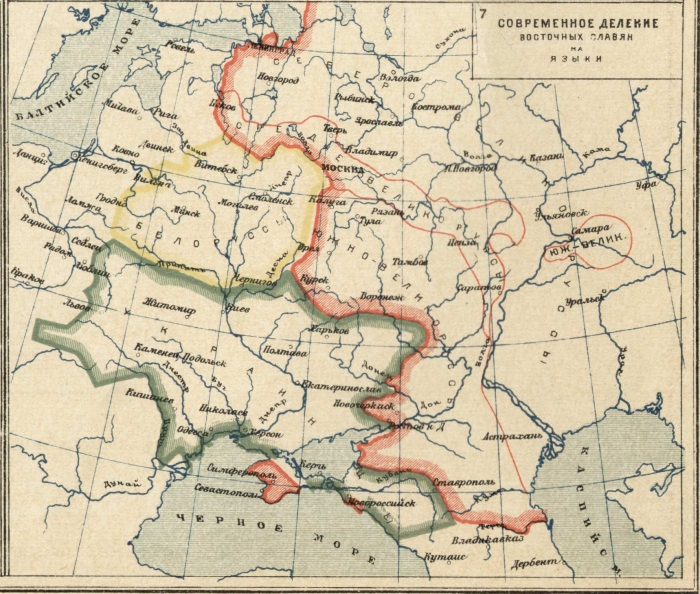
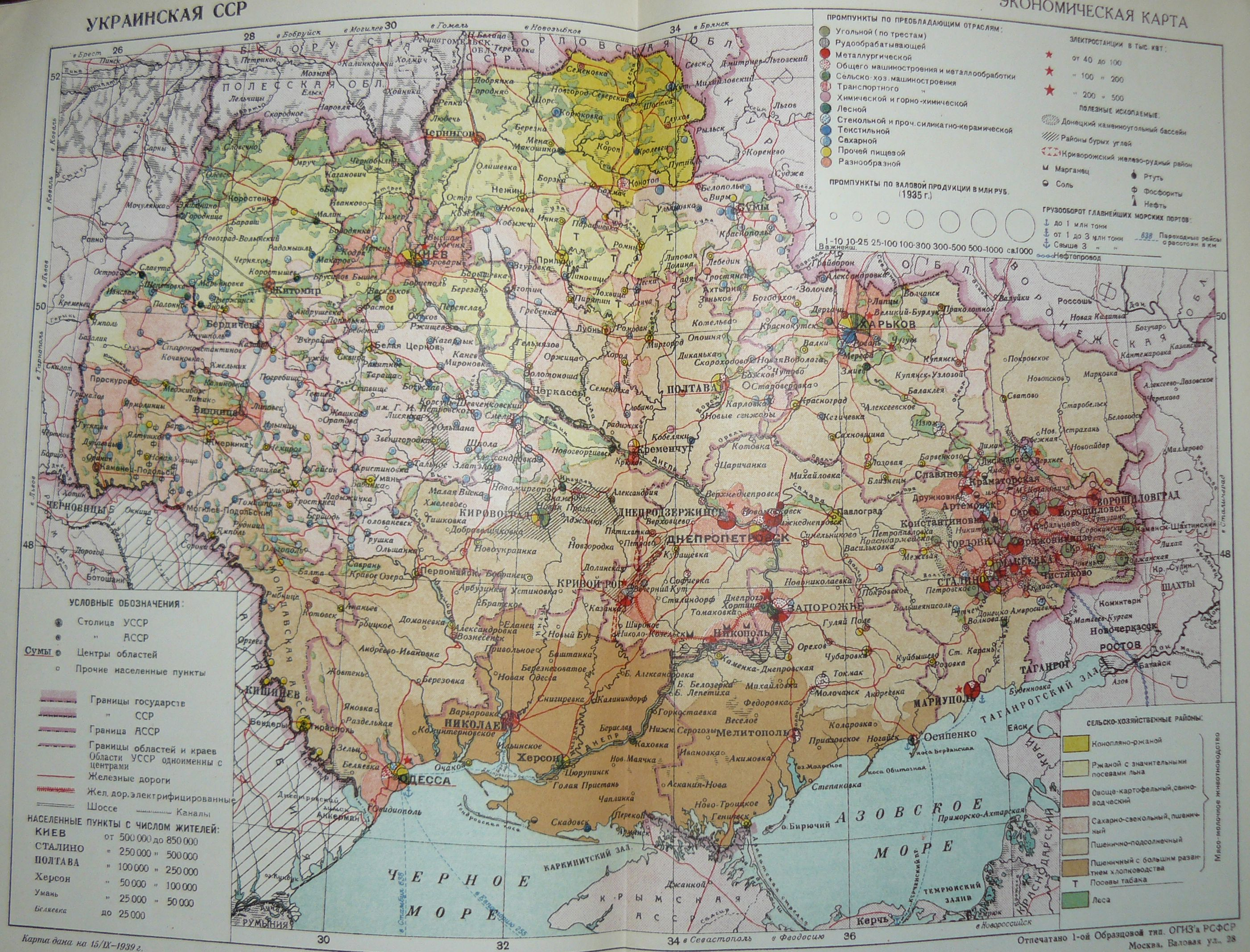
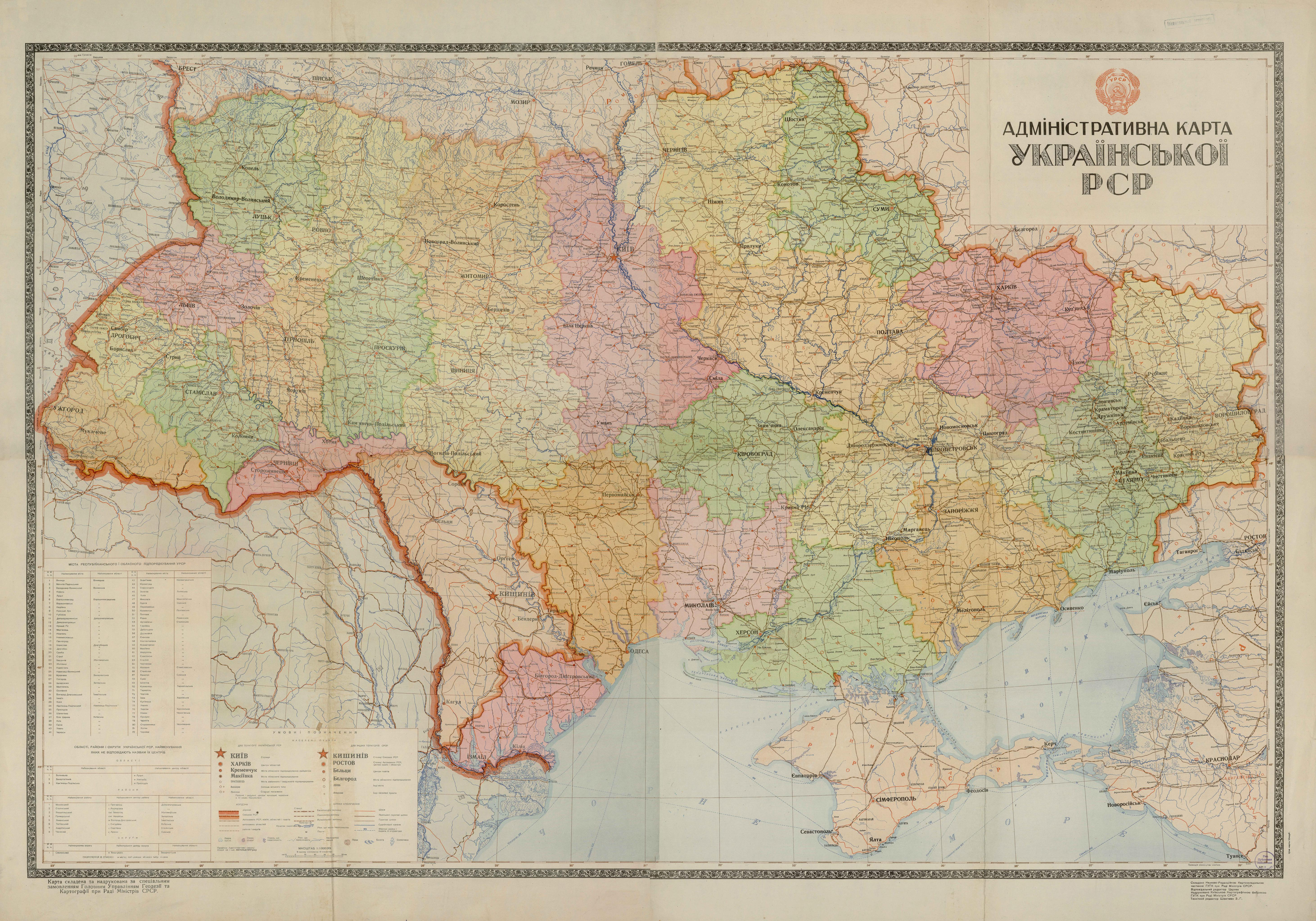
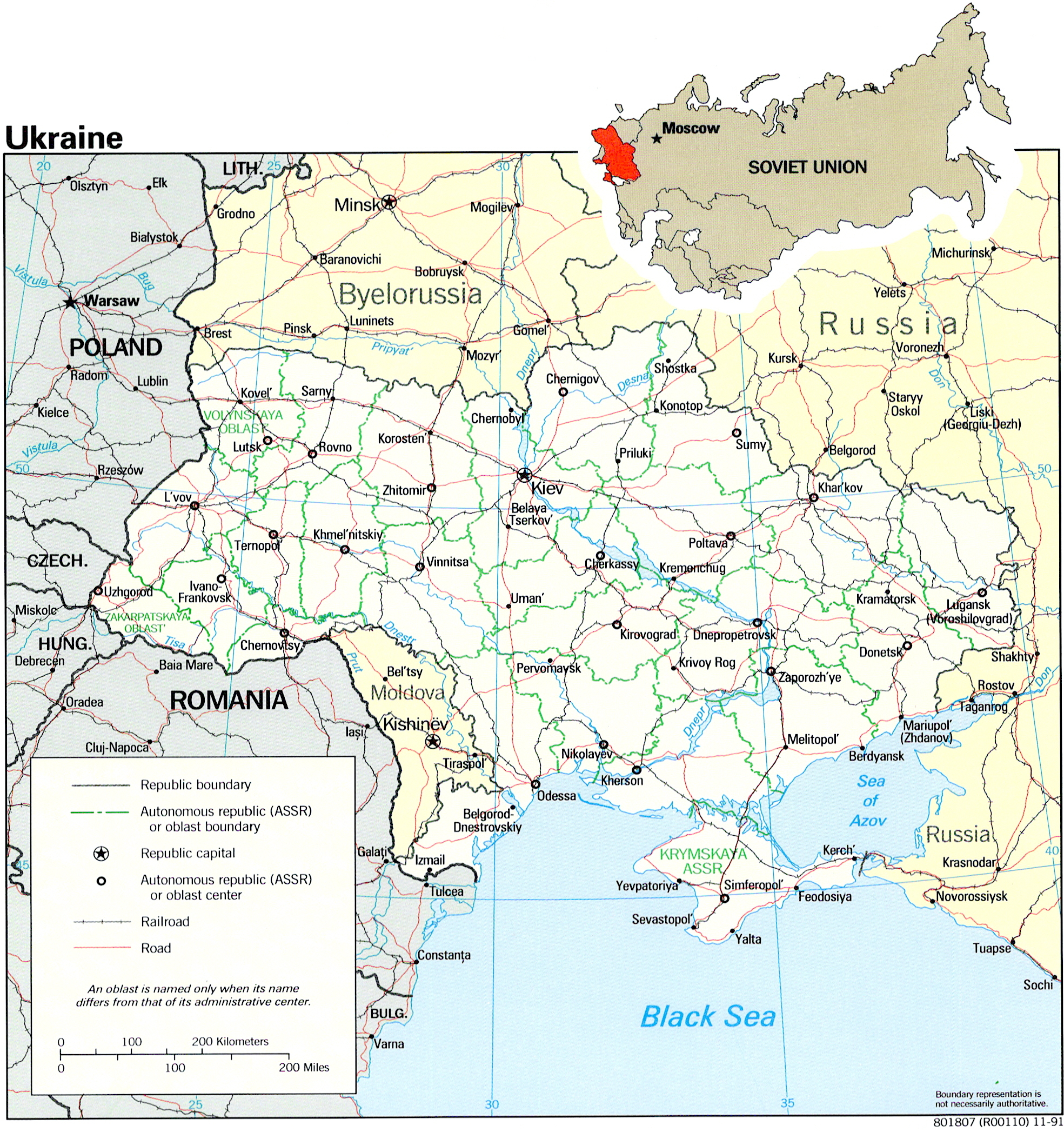
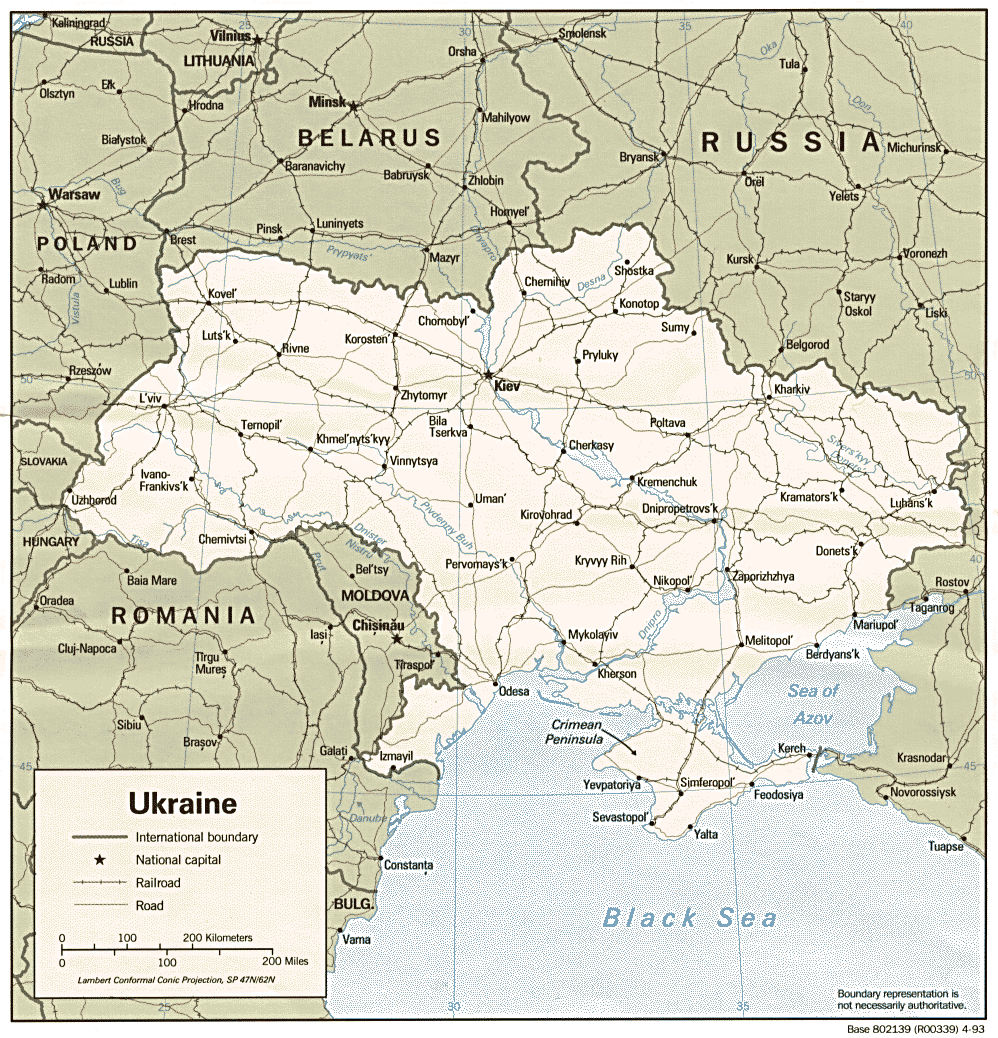
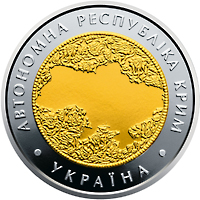
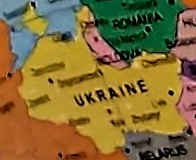
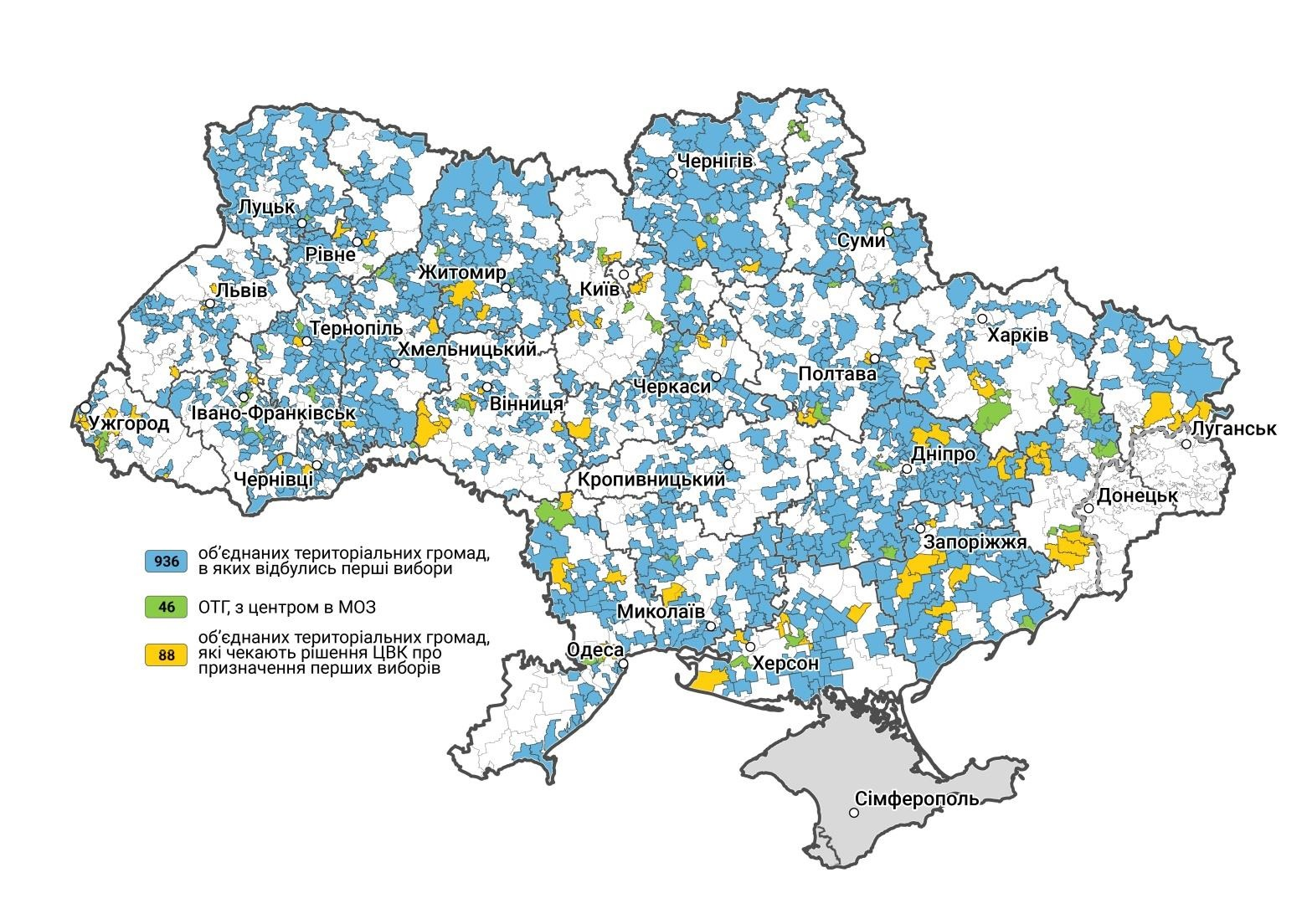
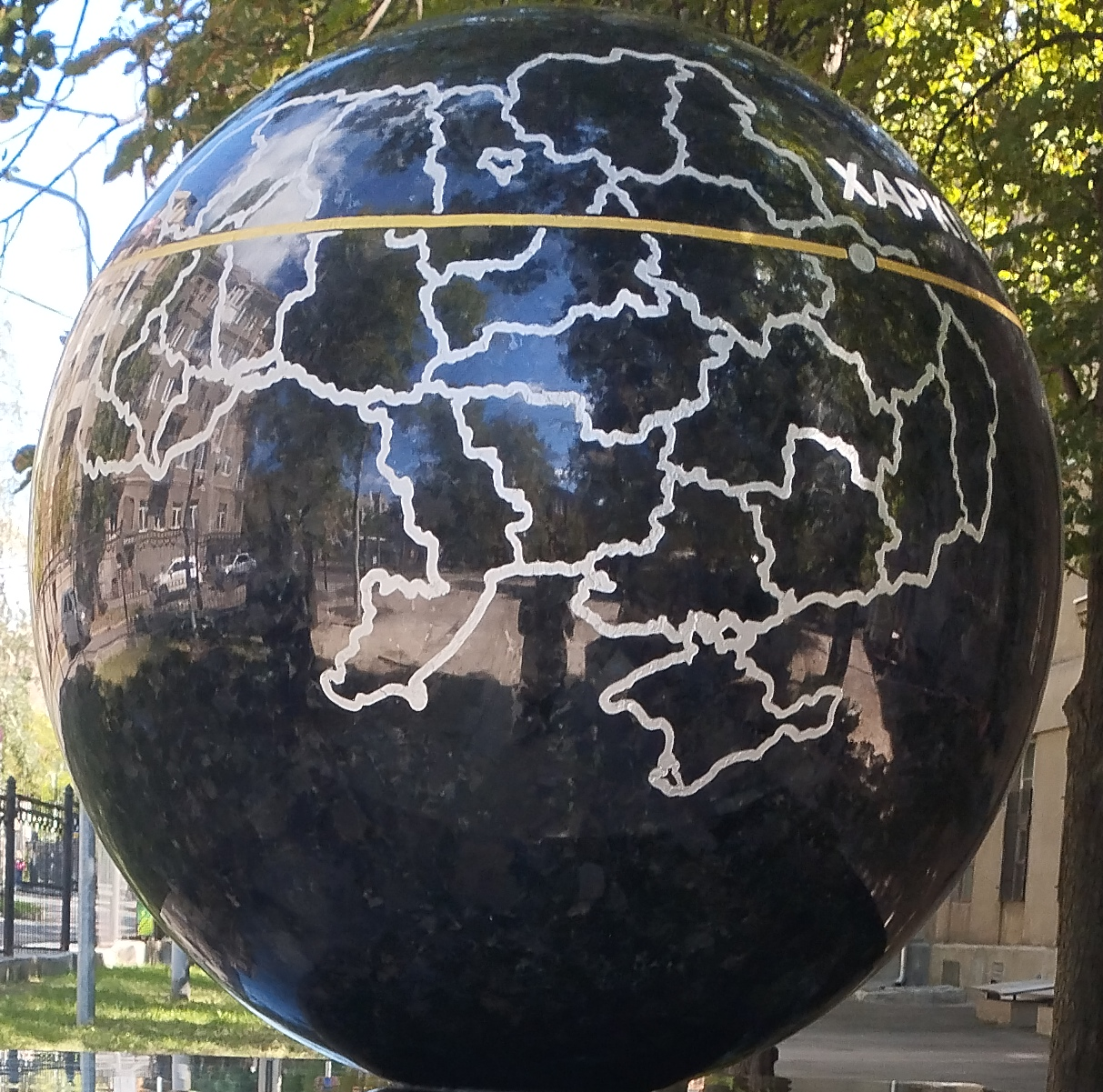
Year	Original Name	Name in English	Author	Description	Map
500s BC		Hecataeus world map	Hecataeus of Miletus	A map of Europe, Asia and Libya (Oikumene), where territory of Scythians, predecessors of Ukrainians, represented exactly in place of Ukraine.
230s		Dura-Europos route map	Cohors XX Palmyrenorum	Map of the northern Black Sea coast, drawn on the shield of a Roman soldier, discovered in 1923 in Dura-Europos.
1154		Map of al-Idrisi	Abu Abdullah Muhammad al-Idrisi al-Qurtubi al-Hasani al-Sabti	The map of al-Idrisi in 1154 shows not only the territorial placement of Ukraine, but also for the first time the name "Rusia" (meaning Kievan Rus'). The inscriptions on the map include "Ard al Rusia" - the land of Rus' (the territory of Right-bank and Left-bank Ukraine), "muttasil ard al Rusia" - the connected land of Rus', "minal Rusia al tuani" - dependent on Rus'. The rivers - Dnipro, Dniester, Danube - are marked and labeled, as well as Kyiv (Kiau) and other Ukrainian cities.
1375	Atles Català	Catalan Atlas (Portolan)	Abraham Cresques	The cartography was done during the decline of the Kingdom of Galicia–Volhynia during the Galicia–Volhynia Wars, as well as the Great Troubles of the Golden Horde. The map shows the cities of Lviv (Ciutà de Leó) and Kyiv (Chiva), as well as the country of Rus' (Rossia) on the right bank of the Dnipro. Lviv is marked as a European city with a flag whose coat of arms appears in the Castilian armorial Book of Knowledge of All Kingdoms. Kyiv is depicted as an independent Asian city; it is located in the lower reaches of the Dnipro.
1436	Atlante di Andrea Bianco	Atlas of Andrea Bianco	Andrea Bianco	Map of the Black Sea
1544		"Cosmographia". Map of the Polish region	Sebastian Münster	Rus (Peremyshl, Lviv, Lutsk, Kyiv), Podolia (Kamianets-Podilskyi, Horodets, Bastarnia), Bessarabia, Scythia, Crimea (Perekop, Kaffa); Muscovy, Pskov region, Tataria; Livonia (Riga), Sarmatia, Lithuania (Vilnius, Hrodna), Prussia (Marienburg, Danzig), Mazovia, Greater Poland, Lesser Poland, Hungary, Wallachia, Moldavia.
1550		Black Sea basin Portolan	Battista Agnese	Rus', Tataria and Muscovy
1559		Black Sea Portolan	Diogo Homem
1568	...dirego della seconda...		Forlani
1571	Tabula Sarmatiae from Strabonis Rerum Geographicarum	Ptolemy's map	Sebastian Münster	European Sarmatia with the cities of Olbia, Heraclea, Theodosia, Claypida and geographical features such as the Carpathian Mountains, the Dnieper (Borysthenes), the Dniester (Tyras), Tauria, the Sea of Azov (Paludes Meotidis), the Black Sea (Ponti Evxini), Amadotian Lake and others.
1613	Magni Ducatus Lithuaniae Caeterarumque Regionum Illi Adjacentium . . . Anno 1613 (I)	Radziwiłł map	Hessel Gerritsz, Willem Janszoon Blaeu	The map shows "Eastern Volhynia, which is also called Ukraine and Nis by others" between Rzhyshchiv and Kaniv in central Podniprovia. It is one of the earliest cartographic sources with the mention of "Ukraine". A copy was included in the 1635 edition of the Theatrum Orbis Terrarum by Willem Janszoon Blaeu.
1639	Tabula Geographica Ukrainska	Ukrainian Geographical Map	Guillaume Le Vasseur de Beauplan	Hand-drawn map, became the basis of his General Map of Ukraine.
1648	Delineatio Generalis Camporum Desertorum vulgo Ukraina	General Map of the Wild Fields, in common speech Ukraine	Guillaume Le Vasseur de Beauplan	Together with Beauplan's Description of Ukraine (1651, 1660), this General Map of Ukraine and its later derivatives (numerous reprints, editions, copies, translations, adaptations) played a major role in raising knowledge of Ukraine in Western Europe.
1649	Typus Generalis Ukrainæ sive Palatinatuum Podoliæ, Kioviensis et Braczlaviensis terras nova delineatione exhibens	General Image of Ukraine or the Palatinates [Voivodeships] of Podolia [Podillia], Kiov [Kyiv] and Braczlav [Bracław], showing the lands with a new map	Jan Janssonius or Willem Hondius	Originally sketched by Beauplan of the Podilia and Kyiv voivodeships. Reprinted in 1658. Later reprinted by Moses Pitt as part of the English Atlas (1681).
1651	Delineatio Specialis et Accurata Ukrainae	Special and Accurate Map of Ukraine	Guillaume Le Vasseur de Beauplan	Derived from the fifth version of his General Map of Ukraine.
1659–1685	Ukrainae pars quae Kiovia Palatinatus vulgo dicitur	Ukrainian lands, Kyiv Voivodeship	Guillaume Le Vasseur de Beauplan, Covens & Mortier
Late 17th century	Ukraine Pars qva Podolia...	Ukrainian lands, Podillia	Covens & Mortier	The Covens map was created based on the map by Beauplan.
Late 17th century	Ukrainae pars quae Barclavia...	Ukrainian lands, Bracław region	Covens & Mortier	Published in Amsterdam.
1662	Ukraine Pars qva Pokutia...	Ukrainian lands, Carpathians.	Joan Blaeu	Modern Ivano-Frankivsk Oblast. Created by cartographer Guillaume Le Vasseur de Beauplan.
1665	La Russie Noire ou Polonoise	Black or Polish Rus'	Nicolas Sanson	Black Rus' (Galicia)
1665	Tartarie Europeenne ou Petite Tartarie…	European Tartaria or Little Tartary	Nicolas Sanson	Tartary, Ukraine - the state of the Cossacks, Muscovy and Poland.
1665	Haute Volhynie, ou Palatinat de Lusuc; tire de la Grande Carte d'Ukraine de Beauplan	Upper Volyn, or Palatinate of Lutsk; part of the Great Map of Ukraine of Beauplan	Nicolas Sanson
17th century	Vkraina	Ukraine	Wilhelm Pfann
1670	Regni Polonia magni ducatus Lithuania	Kingdom of Poland; Grand Duchy of Lithuania	Carlo Alard	Poland, Lithuania, and Ukraine as part of the Polish-Lithuanian Commonwealth
1674	Vkraine ou Pays des Cosaques	Ukraine or State of the Cossacks	Guillaume Sanson
1684	Tartaria d'Europa ouero Piccola Tartaria	European Tartary or Little Tartary	Giacomo Cantelli	Dnieper Ukraine marked as "Ukraine or the land of the Zaporozhian Cossacks" (Vkraina o Paese de Cossachi di Zaporowa). To the east of it is another Ukraine - "Ukraine or the land of the Don Cossacks, dependent on Moscow" (Vkraina ouero Paese de Cossachi Tanaiti Soggetti al Moscouita).
1705	Королевства Польского и Великого княжества Литовского чертеж	Plan of the Kingdom of Poland and Grand Duchy of Lithuania	Peter Picart	The map depicts the territories of the Grand Duchy of Lithuania. There are also markings for Ukraine (Ꙋkraіna) and Part of Moscow State.
1705	Le mar noire... Et les pars Cosaques...	The Black Sea... And the Lands of the Cossacks...	Nicolas de Fer	The northern Black Sea coast - the lands of the Cossacks - Ukraine, and Little Tataria.
1706	Carte de Moscovie	Map of Muscovy	Guillaume Delisle	At the bottom of this cropped 1706 map of Muscovy, Ukraine Pays des Cosaques ("Ukraine Country of Cossacks") is depicted.
1710(?)	Ukraine grand pays de la Russie Rouge avec une partie de la Pologne, Moscovie...	Great Country - Ukraine, Red Ruthenia, bordering with Poland, Muscovy, Wallachia...	Pierre Van Der Haeghen;
1710	Ukraina	Ukraine	Abraham Allard	Map of Poland and Muscovy (including Lithuania, Ukraine, Russia, Volhynia, Courland, Crimea, Wallachia, Livonia)
1711	Ukraine ou Palatinat de Kiowie	Ukraine, Kiev Voivodeship	Guillaume Delisle	Map of Kiev Voivodeship. Published by Hendrik Florisz Scheurleer in a book Théatre complet et particularisé de la guerre du nort (1724–1768) Wydawca pbl (table 9). In the book also published overview map of Black Sea region (table 17), map of Crimea and Taurida (table 15), and parts of Ukraine territory on neighbour regions maps.
1720	Vkrania que terra Cosaccorvm...	Ukraine - land of the Cossacks	Johann Baptist Homann	Map "Ukraine or Cossack land with neighboring provinces of Wallachia, Moldavia, and Little Tartary" by Johann Baptist Homann, Nuremberg, 1716. Western and central parts of Ukraine are shown. Near UKRANIA is marked as RUSSIA RUBRA. According to one version, the man sitting and smoking a pipe surrounded by associates depicted on the cartouche is Ivan Mazepa.
1723	Unnamed map in Travels through Europe, Asia and into parts of Africa		Aubry de La Mottraye	The author served king Charles XII of Sweden, staying with his army in Bender, Moldova during 1709–1713 after their retreat from the 1709 Battle of Poltava. Most details concern western Black Sea coastal towns between Bender on the Dniester and Constantinople (modern Istanbul), with few details on the area he called "UCKRANIA" except "Pultava" (Poltava, marked with crossed swords) on the left bank and a few towns including "Kiow" (modern Kyiv) on the right bank. Mottraye published Travels through Europe, Asia and into parts of Africa in London in 1723 (dedicated to George I), including this map with (dedicated probably to Robert Sutton (diplomat)).
1730	Nova Mappa Maris Nigri…	New Map of the Black Sea	Matthäus Seutter
1740	Nova Et Accurata Tartarie Europe Seu Minoris…	European Tartary	Matthäus Seutter	Little Tartary and Ukraine - land of the Cossacks.
1740	Nova et accurata Turcicarum et Tartaricarum Provinciarum		Matthäus Seutter	Malo-Tartary and Ukraine - Cossack State.
1740-1745	Theatre de la Guerre Dans La Petite Tartarie La Crimee La Mer Noire &c. Dressee, Jean Covens & Corneille Mortier		Guillaume Delisle
1750	Amplissima Ucraniae Regio Palatinus	The largest part of Ukraine, the Palatine Region	Tobias Conrad Lotter	Ukrainian lands
1781	Russia Rossa		Antonio Zatta	Translates to "Dry Rus". According to another version - "Red Rus".
1918	Dismembered Russia — Some of the Fragments	Dismembered Russia — Some of the Fragments	The New York Times	Article from The New York Times published on 17 February 1918 at the end of World War I, showing the provisional boundaries of the Ukrainian People's Republic (UPR), which emerged from the collapsed Russian Empire. The accompanying title and caption reflect U.S. and Allied foreign policy at the time. (Note: The overall Tendenz of the caption is negative towards Ukrainian independence; at the time, the United States and other Allies of World War I were trying to assist the Whites to restore the Russian Empire (which had been "dismembered" into "fragments", suggesting it should be put back together), and engaged in direct combat with the Central Powers, which had just (depending on one's point of view) invaded/liberated Ukraine. On the other hand, the Allies did favour an independent Polish state, primarily as an ally against Germany and Austria-Hungary. Reflecting a pro-Polish perspective, the caption states that the transfer of Kholm to Ukraine was done "on the basis of the extreme claims of the Ukrainians", while pointing out "Ukraine gets no Austro-Hungarian territory"; UPR diplomats had indeed sought the inclusion of Eastern Galicia. Perhaps somewhat ironically, right next to this map, The New York Times reprinted "Ukraine's Struggle for Self-Government", an article written just before the war by Mykhailo Hrushevsky (president of the Ukrainian People's Republic, 28 March–29 April 1918), with a very positive attitude towards Ukrainian independence.)
1918	Der Ukraine: Land und Volk. Die ukrainische Volksrepublik in ihren voraussichtlichen Grenzen	Ukraine: Country and People. The Ukrainian People's Republic within its Provisional Borders	Schropp Land & Karte, Berlin	A German map of the Ukrainian People's Republic, probably from early 1918, to familiarise the general public with this newly independent country, which the Central Powers of Germany, Austria-Hungary, Bulgaria and the Ottoman Empire had formally recognised at Brest with the Bread Peace of 9 February 1918. It makes some general observations about the size of Ukraine's territory and population, comparing it to other European countries, while its economy is compared to the rest of the former Russian Empire, claiming that "Ukraine was the economic backbone of Russian power", dwarfing "the rest of Russia" in peacetime production of grain, sugar, iron, coal, anthracite, and coke. (Note: Ukraine has long been known as "the Breadbasket of Europe"; the map states In der Ukraine liegt das berühmte Schwarzerdegebiet. Dieses erzeugte fast das ganze Ausfuhrgetreide Rußlands. ("Ukraine is home to the famous black earth region. This produced almost all of Russia's export grain.") It was especially the unfolding food crisis and famine in Austria in late 1917 and early 1918 which pushed diplomats of Austria-Hungary to conclude a separate peace with the Ukrainian People's Republic, recognising its independence on the basis of national self-determination, knowing this would embolden ethnic separatism within their own multi-ethnic empire; because without access to Ukrainian foodstuffs to feed its starving military and civilians, a domestic revolution was expected to topple the Habsburg monarchy within weeks. (This is why the Treaty of 9 February 1918 was labelled a "Bread Peace". In the end, the foodstuffs from Ukraine only bought Austria-Hungary several more months of time, before the emboldened separatists indeed pushed for independence, and caused the Dissolution of Austria-Hungary in late 1918). The map goes on to summarise how Ukraine's mineral industry might benefit the Central Powers: "The economic production of Ukraine in peacetime could secure the need of the Central Powers, its rich deposits of coal, iron ore, salt and petroleum would leave a surplus for Central Europe.")
1919	Carte de Ukraine			A map presented by the delegation of the Ukrainian People's Republic (UPR) at the Paris Peace Conference.
1920	Світова мапа з розміщенням Українців по світу	World Map with the Distribution of Ukrainians around the World	Georg Hasenko	Map of Ukraine and the Ukrainian diaspora in 1920.
1928	Contemporary Division of Eastern Slavs by Language	Modern division of Eastern Slavs by language	Kudryashov K. V.	A map published in the "Russian Historical Atlas" in Moscow, which received the first prize of the TsEKUB and the Central Executive Committee of the USSR.
1939	«Украинская ССР. Экономическая карта»	Ukrainian SSR. Economic map	Ukrainian SSR government authorities	Economic map of the Ukrainian Soviet Socialist Republic as of 15 September 1939, in Russian Cyrillic. At this time during the interwar period, Galicia (Halychyna) and Volhynia (Volyn') were part of the Second Polish Republic; Budjak was part of Greater Romania; and Crimea was part of the Russian SFSR.
1947	«Адміністративна карта Української РСР»	Administrative Map of the Ukrainian SSR	Scientific and Editorial Cartographic Department	Administrative map of the Ukrainian SSR as of 1 November 1947 (na lystopada 1947 roku), in Ukrainian Cyrillic. Izmail Oblast, established in 1940, would be added to Odesa Oblast on 15 February 1954. Four days later, Crimea was transferred to Ukraine.
1991	Ukraine	Ukraine	Central Intelligence Agency	"Includes Soviet Union location inset." The map shows Ukraine just before the Declaration of Independence of Ukraine on 24 August 1991. All toponyms within Ukraine were derived from Russian endonyms.
1993	Ukraine Map (Political) 1993	Ukraine Map (Political) 1993	Central Intelligence Agency	All toponyms within Ukraine were derived from Ukrainian endonyms, except that of the capital city of Kyiv, which was still rendered Kiev.
1997	Ukraine on a sphere (globe)		Vinnytsia State Cartographic Factory	A globe with physical map of Ukraine strettched to 2/3 of sphere. with neighbor country borders titled. ∅ 120 mm.	Further information: SSPE Kartographia § Maps and globes
2005	Ukraine. Administrative-physical globe		SSPE Kartographia (or Vinnytsia State Cartographic Factory)	A globe with administrative and physical maps on opposite hemispheres, with neighbor country borders titled. ∅ 120 mm.	Further information: SSPE Kartographia § Maps and globes
2010	Ukraine. Administrative-physical globe		SSPE Kartographia	A globe with administrative and physical maps on opposite hemispheres. Without neighbor country borders titled. ∅ 160 mm.	Further information: SSPE Kartographia § Maps and globes
2010	Ukraine: Location Map (2010)	Ukraine: Location Map (2010)	OCHA	Basic map of Ukraine (with a world location inset), featuring some of its most populous cities with Ukrainian-derived endonyms, including Kyiv, and Odesa with one s. Only the river Dnieper was still based on a Russian-derived English exonym.
2014	Ukraine	Ukraine	United Nations	General map of Ukraine, an UN member state, as of 1 March 2014.
2014	2014 Russo-ukrainian-conflict map	2014 Russo-ukrainian-conflict map	Wikimedia Commons and other	A map of southeastern Ukraine (with a Europe location inset) made by the Wikimedia community in September/October 2014 to depict the Russian annexation of Crimea and the War in Donbas.
2018	Автономна Республіка Крим (монета 5 гривень)	Autonomous Republic Crimea (coin 5 hryvnias)	Ivanenko Svyiatoslav, National Bank of Ukraine	Map of Ukraine on a coin. Minted as a part of the Oblasts of Ukraine (coin series). Crimea name title text placed on top, and Ukraine title text placed below the map.
2021	The World Turned Upside Down (It's No Game)		Mark Wallinger	Map of Ukraine on the upside down terrestrial globe. (preview image cropped from a full globe photo)
2020	Мапа об'єднаних територіальних громад України	Joint Territorial Communities Map of Ukraine	Ministry of Communities and Territories Development of Ukraine	A map of the Decentralization in Ukraine depicting newly formed subregions (Joint Territorial Communities), after old subregions (Raions) was reshaped, submerged or retired. Top-level regions (Oblasts) are not changed, as they are defined in the Constitution of Ukraine.
2014-2022	Russo-Ukrainian conflict (2014-2022)	Russo-Ukrainian conflict (2014-2022)	Wikimedia Commons and other	A map of southeastern Ukraine (with a Europe location inset) made by the Wikimedia community in September/October 2014 to depict the Russian annexation of Crimea and the War in Donbas.
2023	Black Sea Globe		unknown, sponsored by EU and UNDP	The Black Sea Globe 3D model and rendered as a part of EU4EMBLAS project for the educational winter school «The Globe of The Black Sea», resulted in creation of artistic portolans for the «Black Sea Globe» exhibitions in Ukraine.	Further information: Ministry of Environmental Protection and Natural Resources (Ukraine) § Black Sea Globe
2023			SSPE Kartographia	2023 Easter egg on greeting card. Pysanka or Krashanka, with a map of Ukraine. Sort of Egg Globe of Ukraine. Card published on official site.	Further information: SSPE Kartographia § Maps and globes
2025	50th parallel (globe)		unknown	50th parallel north stone installed on the territory of Kharkiv Polytechnic Institute (Ukraine) in a form of a globe of Ukraine with 50th parallel north crossing the globe.
2022–present	Map of the 2022 Russian invasion of Ukraine	Map of the 2022 Russian invasion of Ukraine	Wikimedia Commons, Institute for the Study of War and other	Russian invasion of Ukraine – ongoing military conflict in Eastern Europe since 2022.
2014–present	Мапа війни в Україні	Ukraine interactive map	Liveuamap	Live online map of the critical breaking news of Ukraine and world news releated to Ukraine, with geolocated source or place of news. Mostly focused on Russo-Ukrainian War. Also, there are regional version of the map for the Middle East, Africa, etc.	https://liveuamap.com
2022–present	Карта повітряних тривог України	Air Raid Alert Map of Ukraine	Alerts.in.ua	Live online map to disseminate air raid alerts and other sort of danger warnings in Ukraine. Shows live notifications and provides access to archived data. There are timelines and tools to analyze the data, visualize it on map and create statistic charts.	https://alerts.in.ua

== See also ==
- Geography of Ukraine
- SSPE Kartographia
- Institute of History of Ukraine
- Andrii Baitsar
- Maria Vavrychyn

== Literature ==
- Vortman, Dmytro; Hordiyenko, Yakiv; Maiorov, Maksym. Terra Ucrainica. Історичний атлас України і сусідніх земель : від кімерійців до сьогодення (in Ukrainian). – Харків: Клуб сімейного дозвілля, 2018. ISBN 978-617-12-3719-3. http://resource.history.org.ua/item/0013856.
- Rashkovskiy, Boris (2018-01-01). "Terra Ukrainica. Historical Atlas of the Ukraine. From the Cimmerian Times to the Present Day". ISTORIYA. doi:10.18254/S0002474-0-1.
- Essar, D. F.; Pernal, A. B. (1982). "Beauplan's "Description d'Ukranie": A Bibliography of Editions and Translations". Harvard Ukrainian Studies. 6 (4). Harvard Ukrainian Research Institute: 485–499. ISSN 0363-5570. JSTOR 41036007.
- Essar, Dennis F.; Pernal, Andrew B. (1990). "The First Edition (1651) of Beauplan's Description d'Ukranie". Harvard Ukrainian Studies. 14 (1/2). Harvard Ukrainian Research Institute: 84–96. ISSN 0363-5570. JSTOR 41036356.
- Kiebuzinski, Ksenya, ed. (2011). Through Foreign Latitudes & Unknown Tomorrows: Three Hundred Years of Ukrainian Émigré Political Culture (PDF). Toronto: University of Toronto. p. 104. ISBN 978-0-7727-6083-8. Archived from the original (PDF) on 3 August 2025.
- Plokhy, Serhii (2006). The Origins of the Slavic Nations: Premodern Identities in Russia, Ukraine, and Belarus (PDF). New York: Cambridge University Press. pp. 10–15. ISBN 978-0-521-86403-9. Archived (PDF) from the original on 6 June 2011.
