= General Map of Ukraine =

1648 map of Ukraine

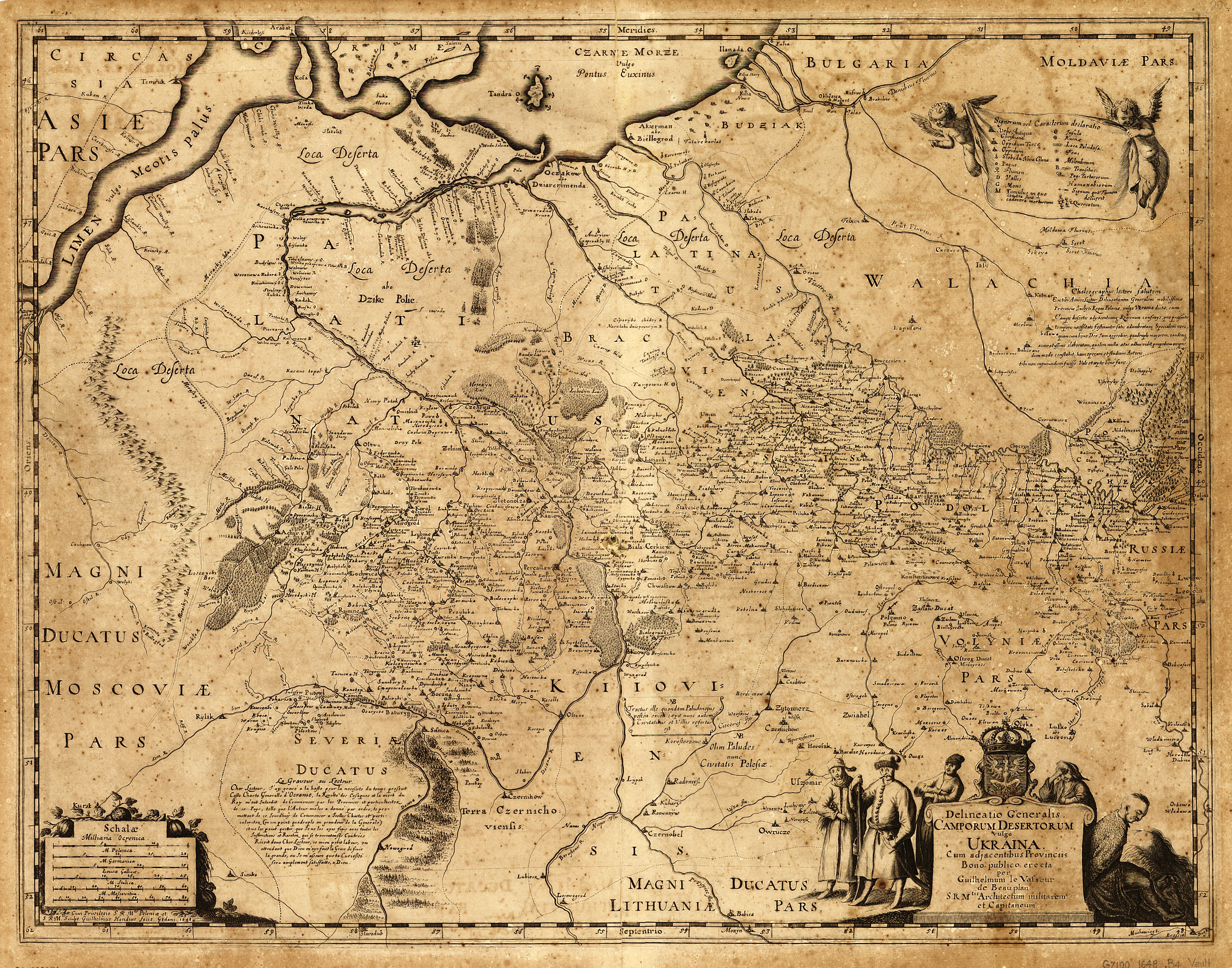
Guillaume Le Vasseur de Beauplan's General Map of Ukraine (1648)

The General Map of Ukraine (Latin: Delineatio Generalis Camporum Desertorum vulgo Ukraina. Cum adjacentibus Provinciis, lit. 'General map of the wild fields, in common speech Ukraine, with adjacent provinces'), is a map including what is now modern Ukraine and its neighbouring countries. It was produced as a manuscript by the French military engineer Guillaume Le Vasseur de Beauplan. It was later published as an engraving by the Dutch cartographer Willem Hondius.

The map measures 42 by 54.5 centimetres (16.5 in × 21.5 in). Published in several versions between 1648 and 1660, it represents one of the earliest reliable maps of the southern part of Eastern Europe. It is also the first map from Western Europe that was dedicated to Ukraine.. Orientated with south pointing upwards, the map is drawn at a scale of 1:1,800,000. It depicts 1293 objects, including 993 populated places and 153 rivers. Along with the 1660 edition of his Description of Ukraine, the General Map of Ukraine is amongst Beauplan's most famous works.

== Creation ==
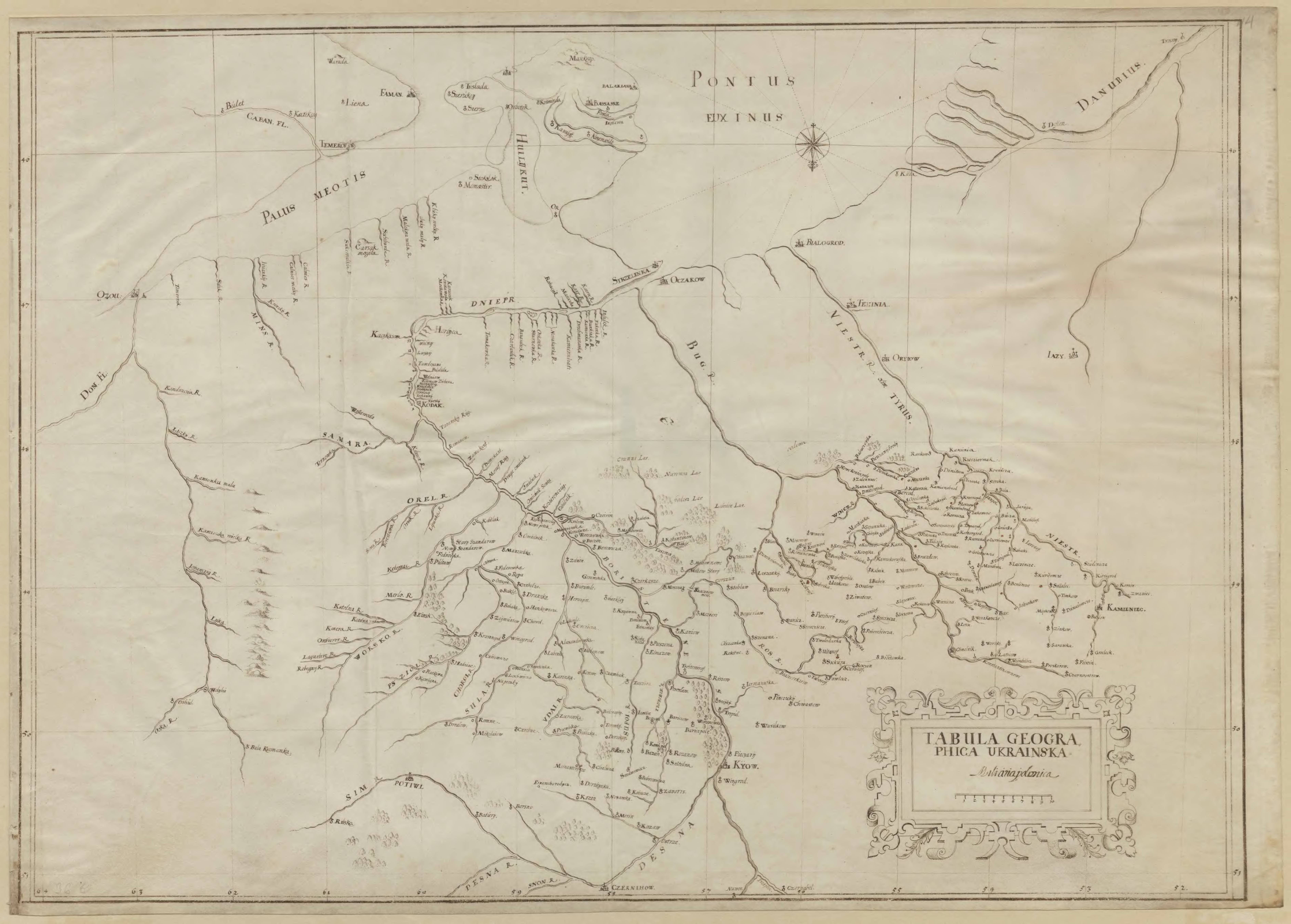
Beauplan's hand-drawn version of his Tabula Geographica Ukrainska (1639), National Archives of Sweden

The General Map of Ukraine was first produced as a hand-drawn map in 1639, titled Tabula Geographica Ukrainska ('Ukrainian Geographical Map'). It is 44.5 by 62.5 centimetres (17.5 in × 24.6 in) with a scale of 1:1,500,000. It showed 275 populated places, 80 named rivers, four named islands, 13 rapids, four forests, and two seas. The area between 47 and 50 degrees north latitude is most fully represented, especially the rivers and settlements near the Dnipro, Southern Bug and Dniester rivers. The map first appeared in an atlas made by the Prussian-Lithuanian cartographer Fryderyk Getkant. It is in the Military Archives in Stockholm.

Beauplan left Ukraine and took with him his maps of Ukrainian lands, which he was granted permission to publish on 8 April 1645. He arranged for the maps to be prepared for publication by the engraver and cartographer Willem Hondius, who prepared the first version of the map in Danzig in 1648. Hondius's map—without the Crimean peninsula—was published in 1648.

== First edition ==
The first edition of the General Map of Ukraine (Latin: Delineatio Generalis Camporum Desertorum vulgo Ukraina. Cum adjacentibus Provinciis) was printed in Danzig in 1648. Four versions were published, and it was constantly revised. The fifth version of the map shows 1293 objects, including 993 populated places and 153 rivers, as well as inscriptions about the recent Battles of Loyew (1649) and Berestechko (1651). In addition, this version of the map shows a fragment of the map separated by the author, divided into 8 squares, with its author's numbering, which became the basis for Beauplan's Special Map of Ukraine.

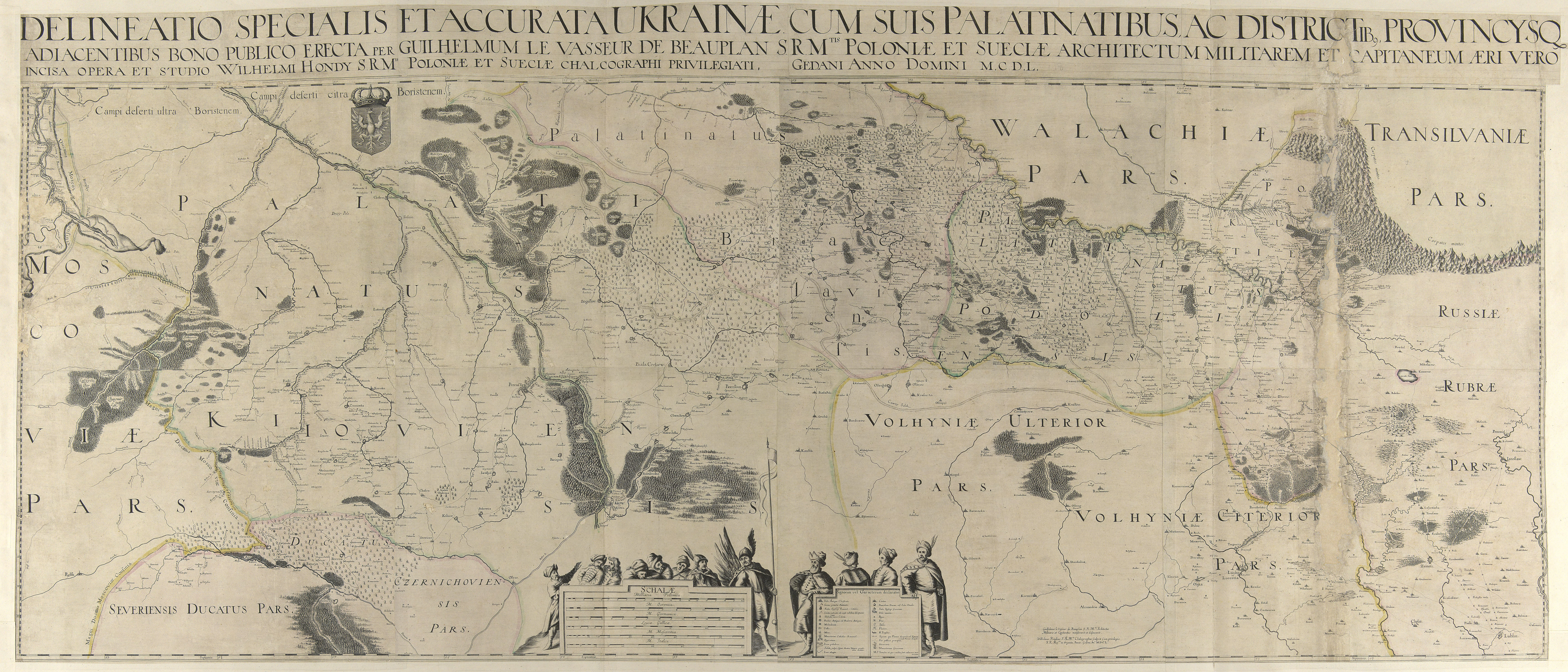
Beauplan's 1651 Delineatio Specialis Et Accurata Ukrainae, or Special and Accurate Map of Ukraine, was derived from the fifth version of his General Map of Ukraine.

The map was never printed in large numbers, as circumstances were not in favour of this, only trial prints of each of the map's variants were printed. Later, after travelling abroad, Beauplan lost contact with the maps engraved by Hondius, due to the latter's death in 1652. Given the importance of these maps, they, along with other materials from the engraver's workshop that remained after his death, were confiscated by the Polish king John II Casimir Vasa.

== Second edition ==
The second edition of Beauplan's Description of Ukraine (1660) included a new general map: Carte d'Ukranie Contenant plusiers Prouinces comprises entre les Confins de Moscouie et les Limites de Transiluanie, engraved by J. Totten in Rouen. It differs considerably from the General Map prepared by Hondius, as it lacks information about the engraver, as well as the engraver's texts of addresses to the reader, which are replaced by forests, and does not show the Medobory mountain ranges. Significant differences are also observed in the depiction of the eastern shore of the Sea of Azov and Kuban, the northern part of the Crimean Peninsula and the Perekop Isthmus, in particular. The map has been significantly updated: unlike the 1648 edition, it contains 1,223 names of objects, including 953 populated places and 153 rivers.

== Studies ==
=== History of research ===
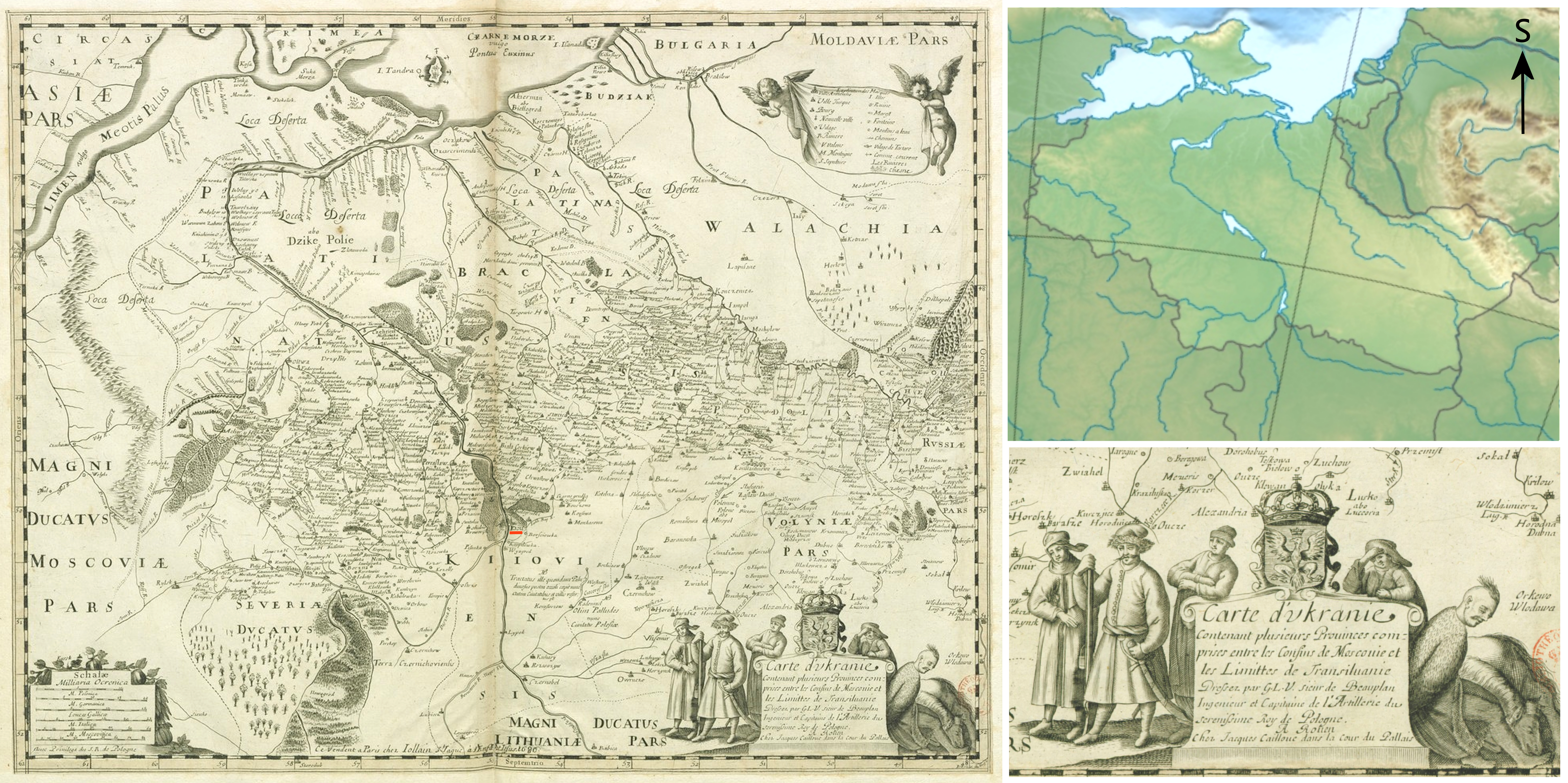
The General Map of Ukraine compared to a south-up geographic map of modern Ukraine

The General Map of Ukraine became available to a wide range of researchers thanks to the publication of V. Kordt in 1899 in the first issue of Materials on the History of Rus' Cartography, the General Map of Ukraine, added to Beauplan's Description of Ukraine in 1660, and in 1910 in the second issue of the General Map of Ukraine of 1648 with additions of 1651, published anonymously in 1662 in the Atlas Maior of Joan Blaeu.

In 1986, the first version of the General Map of Ukraine of 1648 was discovered in the Czartoryski Library in Kraków.

In the 1990s, all surviving copies of the General Map of Ukraine of 1648 and 1660 were studied jointly by the Lviv branch of the Institute of Ukrainian Archeography and Source Studies of the National Academy of Sciences of Ukraine and the Brandon University (Manitoba, Canada). In particular, Maria Vavrychyn made a number of trips to libraries and archival institutions in Poland to search for and photograph individual copies of Beauplan's maps, and photocopies of maps from the archives of Western Europe were donated by Professor Andrzej Bolesław Pernal of Brandon University.

Serhii Plokhy (2006) noted:

Beauplan was using the term "Ukraine" to denote all the provinces of the Kingdom of Poland that bordered on the uninhabited steppe areas (campus desertorum) in one way or another and constituted the steppe frontier of the Commonwealth. "Ukraine" had been used in that sense in official Polish documents at least since 1580, when a decree issued by King Stefan Batory made mention of Ruthenian, Kyivan, Volhynian, Podolian, and Bratslavian Ukraine. In so doing, Batory was merely subscribing to a tradition that went back at least to the twelfth century, when a Rus' chronicler entered a note referring to Pereiaslav Ukraine under the year 1187.

Ksenya Kiebuzinski (2011) observed:

[The map's] principal value for Ukrainianists is its usage of the term 'Ukraine' to designate a specific territory circumscribed by borders. Beauplan's maps would become an authoritative source for mapping Ukraine or the 'Land of the Cossacks' by many late seventeenth- and early eighteenth-century western European cartographers, such as Nicolas Sanson, Guillaume de L'Isle, Johann Baptist Homann, Pieter van der Aa, Matthaeus Seutter, Tobias Konrad Lotter, and Christoph Weigel.

=== Features ===
As of 2011, a total of 14 original copies of the General Map of Ukraine have been found: 7 copies of the map published in Danzig in 1648 and 7 copies of the second edition of this map, made in Rouen and appended to the Description of Ukraine in 1660.

- A comparison of the seven copies of the 1648 Gdańsk edition of the General Map of Ukraine shows that the difference between the versions is a gradual enrichment and correction of their content. For example, while the original version shows a large area of Polissia marshes, all later versions already show a significant number of populated places and new rivers and a warning note that marshes were originally marked here. Willem Hondius left a note about his work on this part of the map. In an address to the reader on the map of Polissia by D. Zwicker, which he also engraved in 1650, the engraver, noting the high accuracy of this map, wrote that... "already when correcting the General Map of the Wild Fields, we were convinced of its accuracy".
- An analysis of seven copies of the 1660 Rouen second edition shows differences in the presence or absence of the Crimean Peninsula, in the drawing of details of the image of Pryazovia and Kuban, and in the placement of additional inscriptions.

== Preservation ==
Copies of the General Map of Ukraine across Europe include:

An edition (Danzig 1648) by the engraver and cartographer Willem Hondius are in Czartoryski Library in Kraków, the Jagiellonian Library in Kraków, the Odesa Museum of Regional History.There are versions of the engraver the work of engraver J. Tutten's map General Map of Ukraine (Rouen 1660) in the Czartoryski Library, the Jagiellonian Library, the Kórnik Library, the Raczyński Library in Poznań, the National Library of Poland in Warsaw, and the Stefanyk National Scientific Library in Lviv.

== Legend and scale ==
The legend of the map is in the upper right corner, on a cartouche that is held by two cherubs. The legend is entitled 'Declaration of signs and symbols'.

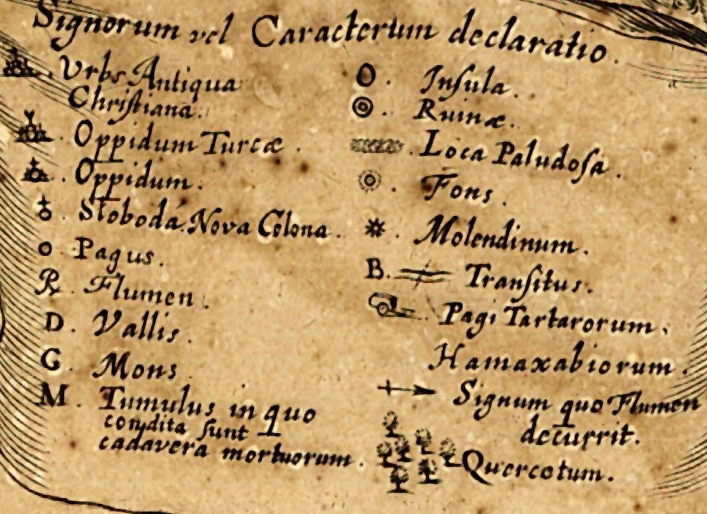
Legend in the upper-right corner of the 1648 General Map of Ukraine

The map uses 18 types of symbols:

- Ancient Christian city (Urbs Antiqua Christiana)
- City of the "Turks" (Muslims) (Oppidum Turcæ)
- City (Oppidum)
- Sloboda (new colony) (Sloboda Nova Colona) (Note: For example, Maslaustaw (Маслів Став), nowadays Maslivka (Маслівка), Myronivka urban hromada, Kyiv Oblast.)
- Village (Pagus)
- River (Flumen)
- Valley (Vallis)
- Mountain (Mons)
- Mounds where the bodies of the dead are buried (Tumulus in quo condita sunt cadavera mortuorum)
- Island (Insula)
- Ruins (Ruinæ)
- Wetlands (Loca Paludosa)
- Source (Fons)
- Мill (Molendinum)
- Crossing/ferry (Transitus)
- Lands of the Tatars, Hamaxabii (Pagi Tartarorum, Hamaxabiorum)
- Direction of river's flow (Signum quo Flumen decurrit)
- Oak groves (Quercetum)

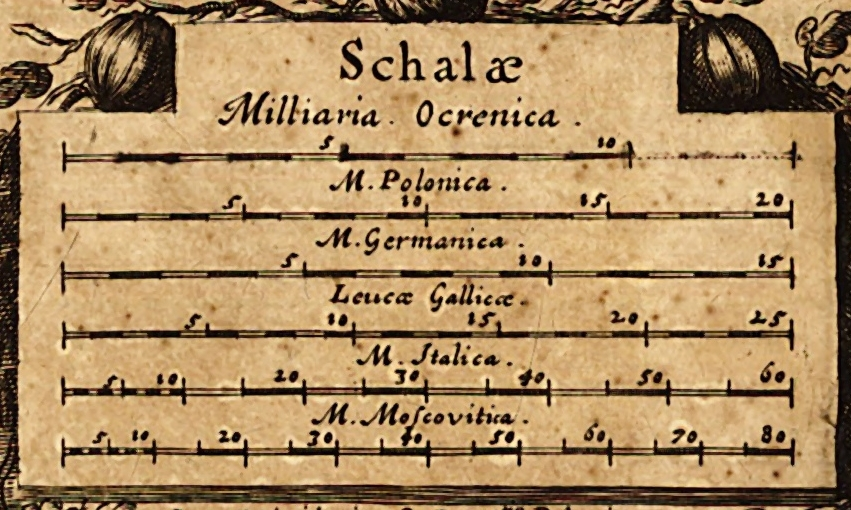
Scale bar in the lower-left corner of the 1648 General Map of Ukraine

The map shows a scale bar with measurements in six different lengths. Milliaria (abbreviated M.) is the origin of the English word miles, while Leucæ Gallicæ is the origin of the term Gallic leagues.

- Ukrainian miles (Milliaria Ocrenica)
- Polish miles (Milliaria Polonica)
- German miles (Milliaria Germanica)
- Gallic (French) leagues (Leucæ Gallicæ)
- Italian miles (Milliaria Italica)
- Muscovite miles (Milliaria Moscovitica)

== Exhibitions in Ukraine ==
In September 2007, an exhibition was held in Kyiv, featuring, among others, the General Map of Ukraine and the Special Map of Ukraine by Beauplan. In late 2023 and early 2024, there were similar, moving exhibitions titled Terra Ucrainorum ("Ukrainian Lands", centred on the maps and writings of Myron Korduba, as well as Beauplan and others) in Saint Sophia Cathedral, Kyiv, Zoloti Vorota metro station and elsewhere in the city, which then became a permanent exhibition in the Museum of the Historical Center of Kyiv Музей історичного центру міста Києва at Bohdan Khmelnytskyi Street 66.

== See also ==
- Cartography of Ukraine
- Description of Ukraine (Beauplan 1651, 1660)
- Name of Ukraine

== Sources ==
- Kiebuzinski, Ksenya, ed. (2011). Through Foreign Latitudes & Unknown Tomorrows: Three Hundred Years of Ukrainian Émigré Political Culture (PDF). Toronto, Canada: University of Toronto. ISBN 978-0-7727-6083-8. Archived from the original (PDF) on 3 August 2025.
- Litinsky, Volodymyr, ed. (2001). Геодезичний енциклопедичний словник /За редакцією Володимира Літинського [Geodetic Encyclopaedic Dictionary] (in Ukrainian). Lviv, Ukraine: Eurosvit. Archived from the original on 10 October 2014.
- Plokhy, Serhii (2006). The Origins of the Slavic Nations: Premodern Identities in Russia, Ukraine, and Belarus (PDF). New York: Cambridge University Press. ISBN 978-0-521-86403-9. Archived from the original (PDF) on 6 June 2011.
- Sossa, R.I. (2007). Історія картографування території України: Підручник для студентів вищих навчальних закладів [History of Mapping the Territory of Ukraine: A Textbook for Students of Higher Educational Institutions] (in Ukrainian). Kyiv, Ukraine: Lybid. ISBN 978-966-06-0463-6.
- Vavrychyn, Maria (2000). Комплекс карт України Ґ. Боплана та їх збереження в бібліотеках Європи [The Complex of Maps of Ukraine by G. Beauplan and Their Preservation in European Libraries]. Картографія та історія України [Cartography and History of Ukraine] (in Ukrainian). Vol. З. Lviv and Kyiv, Ukraine; New York: M. P. Kot.
