= Maria Vavrychyn =

Polish-born Ukrainian historian of cartography (1935–2010)

Maria Hryhorivna Vavrychyn
- Марія Григорівна Вавричин
- Born: 20 March 1935; Mszana, Second Polish Republic
- Died: 28 December 2010 (aged 75); Lviv, Ukraine
- Education: University of Lviv
- Occupations: Historian and archivist at the Institute of Ukrainian Archeography
- Known for: Cartography of Ukraine

Maria Hryhorivna Vavrychyn (Starchak) (Ukrainian: Марія Григорівна Вавричин (Старчак); 20 March 1935 – 28 December 2010) was a Ukrainian historian, archaeographer, bibliographer, and cartography researcher. She was a researcher of the Lviv branch of the Institute of Ukrainian Archeography, a member of the Commission on Bibliography and Book Studies of the Shevchenko Scientific Society in Ukraine, and a member of the Lviv regional organisation of the All-Ukrainian Society "Lemkivshchyna".

== Biography ==
She was born in a Ukrainian peasant family in Mszana, then in the Krosno County of Lwów Voivodeship. She graduated from the Lviv Pedagogical School (1953) and the Faculty of History at the Ivan Franko State University of Lviv (1958).

She began her career in 1958 as a proofreader of the Shchyrets district newspaper. Since 1980, she has worked at the V. Stefanyk National Library of the Academy of Sciences of the Ukrainian SSR as the head of the editorial and publishing department. She was in charge of publishing annual collections of works and bibliographic indexes. Since 1993, she has been a leading archaeographer at the Lviv Department of the M.S. Hrushevsky Institute of Ukrainian Archaeology and Source Studies of the National Academy of Sciences of Ukraine. She worked on the study of the cartographic heritage of Guillaume Le Vasseur de Beauplan, and prepared for publication his Special Map of Ukraine of 1650 (co-authored).

She actively gave lectures to the public, participated in scientific and theoretical seminars, and constantly submitted information about them to the journal Archives of Ukraine («Архіви України»).

She started working at the Central State Archives of the Ukrainian SSR in Lviv in 1959. She worked as an archivist, researcher, head of the Department of Special Historical Disciplines (since 1976), head of the Department of Publications and Document Use (since 1978). She was engaged in improving the funds, the archive catalogue, created a number of methodological manuals, in particular: Scheme of classification of documents of the pre-Soviet period in systematic catalogues of state archives of Ukraine (1976), published articles on source and cartography studies, spoke at republican meetings and conferences. She participated in the preparation of documentary collections: The Struggle for the Reunification of Western Ukraine with the Ukrainian SSR: 1917–1939 (1979), Peasant Movement in Ukraine: 1826–1849 (1985) and the creation of the exposition of the Cabinets of Special Historical Disciplines of the Central State Archives of the Ukrainian SSR in Lviv. She was a scientific secretary of the scientific and theoretical seminar of special historical disciplines at the archives.

At the Second All-Union Conference on the Historical Geography of Russia held in Moscow in November 1980, she delivered a presentation entitled Little-known maps of Ukraine by G. Beauplan about the collection of 11 maps by Beauplan in the collections of the Gdańsk City Library (three of which are cited above), which was discovered by Polish scholar S. Herbst. In her presentation, the researcher described the unknown cartographic heritage of the famous Frenchman and outlined in detail the borders of Ukrainian lands as they were defined by the cartographer on each map. These borders clearly did not coincide with those drawn in politically motivated historiography by Muscovite historians of the time. One of the Soviet professors present stated bluntly: "We need the borders of the Soviet Union, we don't need such maps of Ukraine's borders." For the historian, this speech became a milestone, putting her in front of a difficult choice: either to agree with the 'all-Union' vision of Ukrainian history or to abandon the already approved topic of her PhD thesis Cartographic Sources on the History of Ukraine in the 15th–17th Centuries, with which she was assigned to the Institute of Social Sciences of the Academy of Sciences of the Ukrainian SSR, and keep the work 'in the drawer'. She chose the latter.

== Key publications ==
- Vavrychyn, M., Комплекс карт України Ґ. Боплана та їх збереження в бібліотеках Європи // Картографія та історія України: Зб. наук. праць. [The Complex of Maps of Ukraine by G. Beauplan and their Preservation in European Libraries // Cartography and History of Ukraine: Collection of scientific works.] (2000). Lviv/Kyiv/New York: published by M.P. Kots. pp. 18—22.
- Vavrychyn, M., Ґійом Левассер де Боплан — картограф України [Guillaume Le Vasseur de Beauplan - Cartographer of Ukraine] // Спеціальна карта України Ґійома Левасера де Боплана 1650 року [The Special Map of Ukraine by Guillaume Le Vasseur de Beauplan in 1650] / editors M. Vavrychyn, О. Holko; edited by Ya. Dashkevych, Y. Loza, R. Sossa.)
- Україна на стародавніх картах. Кінець XV—перша половина XVII ст. [Ukraine on Ancient Maps. Late 15th to early 17th centuries.]. (2006). Kyiv: ДНВП Картографія; editors M. Vavrychyn, Yaroslav Dashkevych, У. Р. Кришталович. — 208 с.
- Україна на стародавніх картах. 2 том. Середина XVII — друга половина XVIII [Ukraine on Ancient Maps. 2 vols. Mid-17th century – second half of the 18th century]. (2009). Kyiv: ДНВП Картографія; editors M. Vavrychyn, Yaroslav Dashkevych, У. Р. Кришталович. 224 pp.

== See also ==
- General Map of Ukraine
- Jaroslaw Pelenski

== Sources ==
- Українські архівісти (XIX–XX ст.): Біобібліогр. довідник / Держкомархів України. УНДІАСД; Упоряд.: [ Ukrainian archivists (XIX-XX centuries): Biobibliographical reference book / State Archives of Ukraine. UNDIASD]. Edited by: Iryna Borysivna Matyash (ed.), S.L. Zvorsky, L.F. Prykhodko et al. Kyiv, 2007. 750 pp.
- У Львові вшанували пам'ять знаної дослідниці картографії Марії Вавричин [Famous cartography researcher Maria Vavrychyn commemorated in Lviv] 22 March 2011
- Сьогодні рік з дня смерті дослідниці в галузі історії Марії Вавричин [Today is the one-year anniversary of the death of the history researcher Maria Vavrychyn]
