= Archaeography =

Archaeography, also spelled as Archeography, may refer to:

- in archaeology, archaeography refers to early and descriptive forms of antiquarian and archeological researches
- in historical sciences, archaeography refers to interdisciplinary studies of ancient manuscripts and early printed materials

== See also ==
- Archaeographical Commission
- Institute of Ukrainian Archeography
