= Special Map of Ukraine =

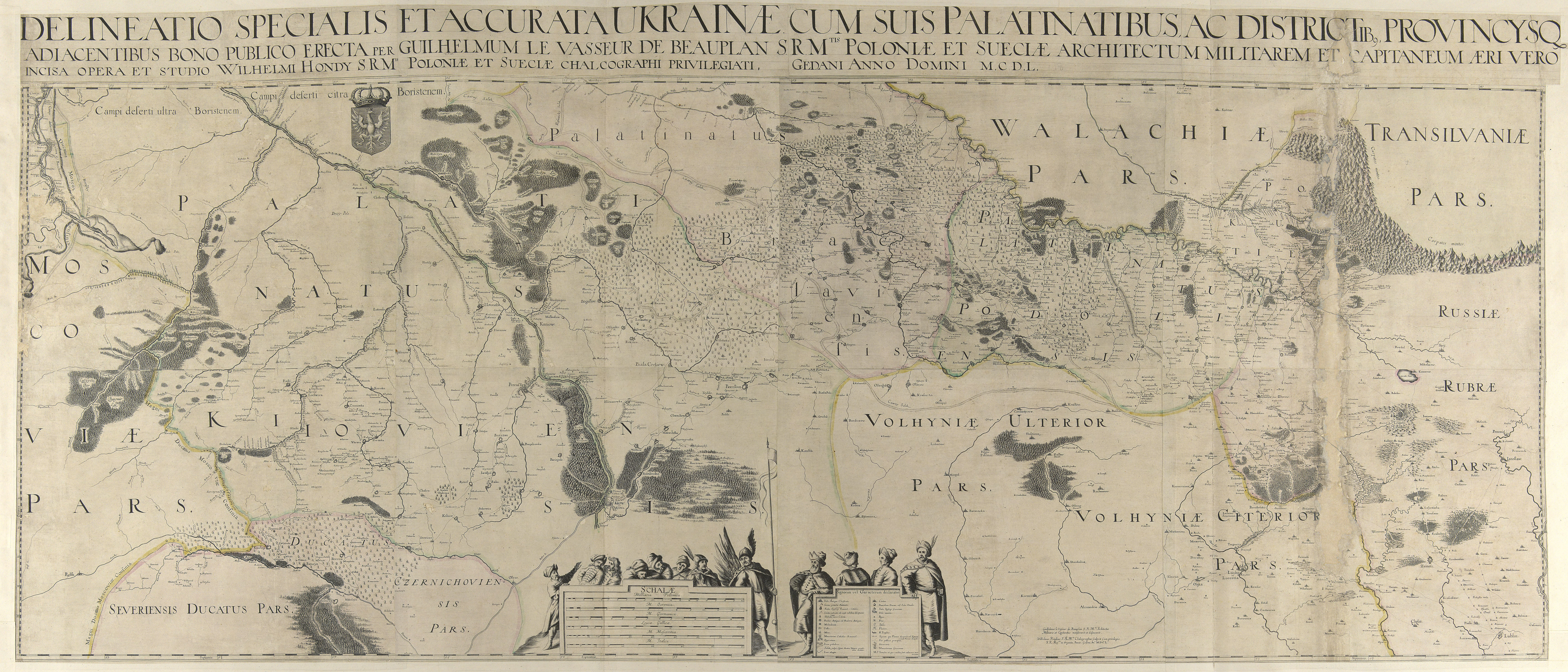
The Delineatio Specialis Et Accurata Ukrainae, or Special Map of Ukraine (1652), derived from Beauplan's 1648 General Map of Ukraine.

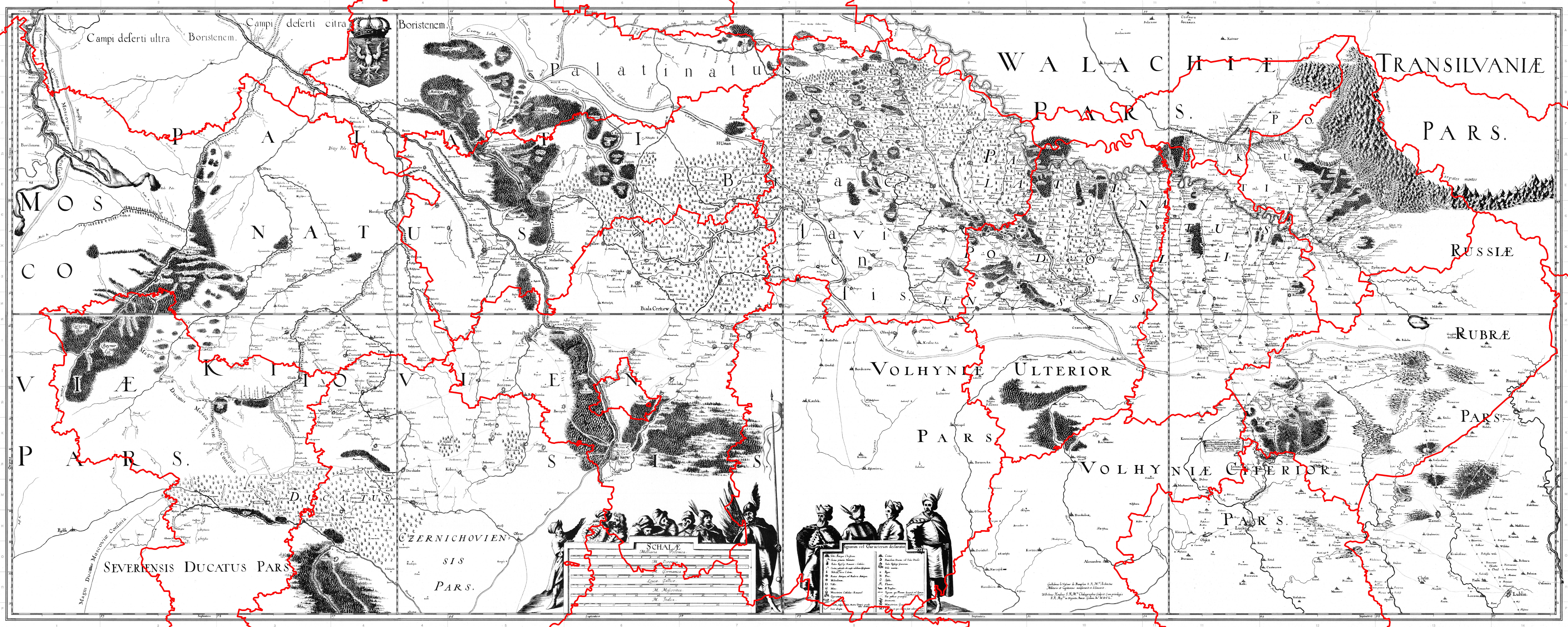
The Special Map of Ukraine, with the borders of the modern Oblasts of Ukraine superimposed in red for comparison (south is up).

The Special Map of Ukraine (Note: In its original title in Latin: Delineatio Specialis Et Accurata Ukrainae Cum Suis Palatinatibus Ac Districti[bus] Provincysq[ue] Adiacentibus. Bono Publico., lit. 'A Special and Accurate Map of the Ukraine with Its Palatinates and Adjacent Provincial Districts. For the Public Good.') is a geographical map of Ukraine and neighbouring countries from the 1650s. It was compiled as a manuscript by the French military engineer Guillaume Le Vasseur de Beauplan (in royal service of the Polish–Lithuanian Commonwealth), and produced as an engraving by the Dutch cartographer Willem Hondius in Gdańsk. The design of the map derived from the fifth version of the first edition of Beauplan's General Map of Ukraine (1 sheet, with a scale of 1:1.800.000), which he first published two years earlier in 1648. However, the Special Map was far larger and more detailed, with 8 sheets and a scale of 1:450.000. According to Serhii Plokhy (2006), "It showed the palatinates of Kyiv, Bratslav, Podilia, Volhynia and, in part, Rus' (Pokutia)."

== Composition ==
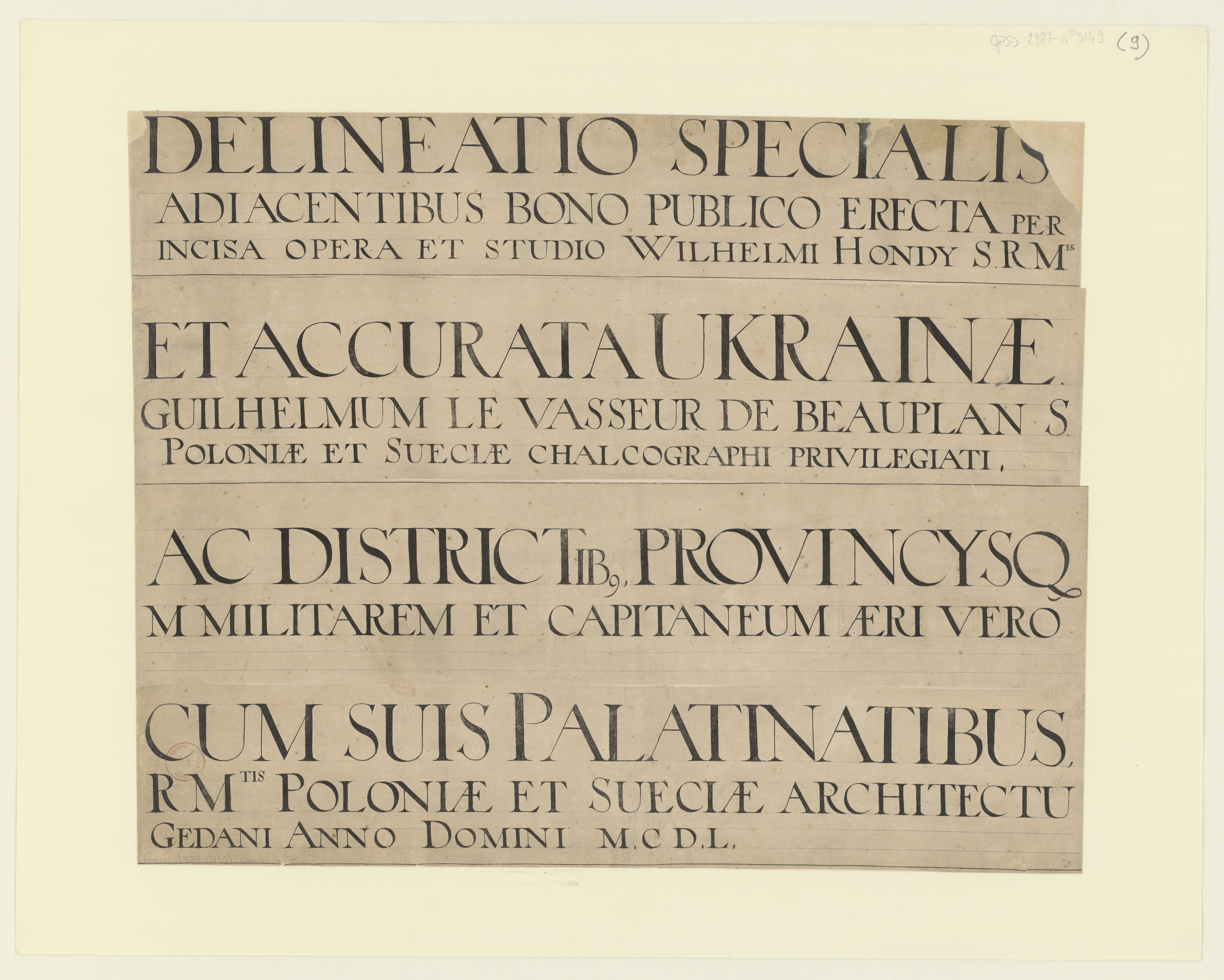
Title of the map (with sheets overlaid).

On 10 March 1645, king Władysław IV Vasa granted Beauplan a privilege to publish the "tabula geographica ditionum regni nostri a regno Hungaria usque ad fines Moschoviae sitarum", which would later become known as his Special Map of Ukraine. Yet, Beauplan explained that due to "the great tasks that occupied me during the war" in Ukraine, the publication would be delayed until 1652, because it "obliged me to devote at least eight years to bringing this work to perfection". For reasons that are unclear, the General Map of Ukraine was printed first, before the Special Map the king had commissioned him to make in 1645. Pernal & Essar (1985) suggested that Władysław's 1646–1647 plans for crusade-style campaign against the Crimean Khanate (an Ottoman vassal) required a map of the lower Dnieper, Crimea and the northwestern Black Sea shores to be produced for immediate military usage.

Beauplan was then fired from service in the Polish Crown Army on 29 March 1647 by hetman Mikołaj Potocki, for unclear reasons. Krawciw (1959) suggested it was "presumably because of the death of his patron, Hetman Koniecpolski, and the advent of a new Hetman Mikolaj Potocki, who was rather unfriendly toward him". Although this compelled Beauplan to return to France, on his way back he stopped in Gdańsk for several months in 1647–1648, where he acquainted Willem Hondius and commissioned him to engrave and print both his more basic General Map (1 sheet) and his larger Special Map (8 sheets). Ultimately, king Władysław's plans went nowhere because he died on 20 May 1648, while the Khmelnytsky Uprising of the Zaporizhian Cossacks had broken out in Ukraine on 25 January 1648, requiring the Commonwealth's attention to secure internal stability rather than attempt external adventures.

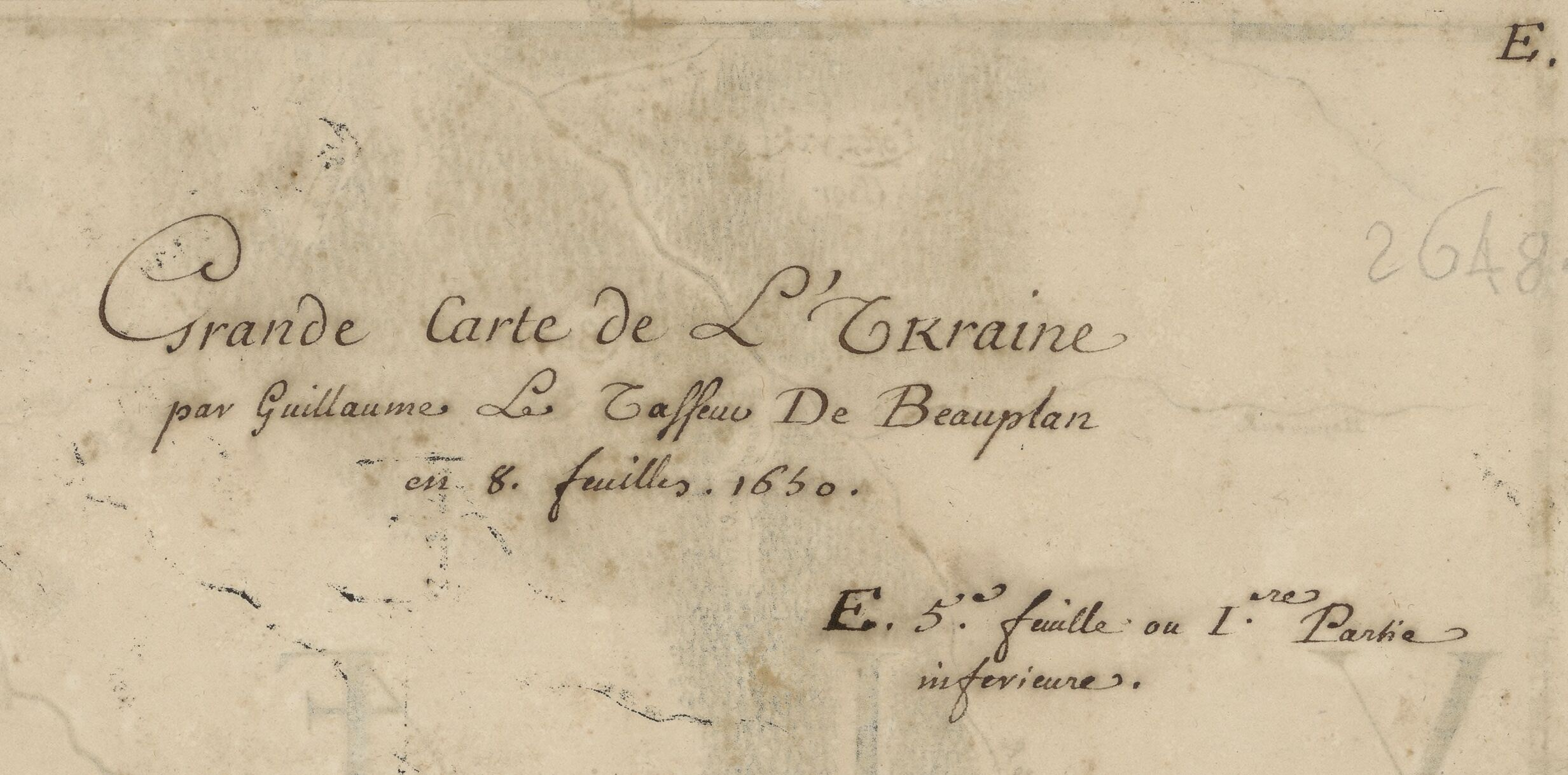
"Great Map of Ukraine, by Guillaume Le Vasseur De Beauplan, on 8 July 1650"

In the first half of 1648, Beauplan returned to Rouen, which Krawciw suggested had to do with matters involving his noble estate there. The Khmelnytsky Uprising had made the publication of his maps and book increasingly urgent, so Beauplan finally began readying his special map (8 sheets) for publication in 1650, and he returned to Hondius in Gdańsk that year for that purpose. Hondius, however, had been in no rush to engrave even the smaller General Map, which wasn't finished when Beauplan returned. Not until 1651, when the battles of Loyiv in 1649 and Berestechko in 1651 could be added on the General Map, was this smaller map published. The fifth version of the General Map of Ukraine shows a fragment of the map separated by the author, divided into 8 squares, with its author's numbering; according to Maria Vavrychyn (2000), these became the basis for Beauplan's Special Map of Ukraine. Three variants of the Special Map of Ukraine are known, one dated 1650, the second a revision of the first in late 1650 or early 1651, and the third dated 30 June 1651. However, these were not published at the time, and Beauplan went back to France in 1651 apparently only with the two original maps (or at least their proofs), not with the expected copies, so that neither the General nor the Special Map of Ukraine was ultimately included in the book he published as soon as he returned to Rouen.

In the first edition of his book Description of Ukraine (1651), Beauplan three times refers to the attached map, but in fact, there is no map in this edition. In all secondary editions of the Description published by Beauplan in Rouen between 1660 and 1673, only versions of the General Map of Ukraine were included, not the Special Map. In 1652 or 1653, Beauplan went to the West Indies, apparently because the political situation in France made it difficult for him as a Huguenot to stay there. Even worse, his business partner Hondius died in 1653 before the Special Map was completed. Meanwhile, Polish king John II Casimir Vasa was engaged in a bitter war with Khmelnytsky and the Cossacks in Ukraine, and really needed the map for his military operations, so he ordered all the possessions of Hondius confiscated from his widow. In 1654, John Casimir granted Gdańsk bookseller and publisher Georg Forster and his associate Joachim Pastorius the royal privilege to complete and publish Beauplan's Special Map of Ukraine. But the very next year, war broke out between Sweden and Poland, and when Forster and Pastorius were compelled to evacuate Gdańsk, all former possessions of Hondius disappeared without a trace; through his publisher, Beauplan complained about this bitterly in the foreword of the second edition of the Description of Ukraine (1660, when he returned from the West Indies):

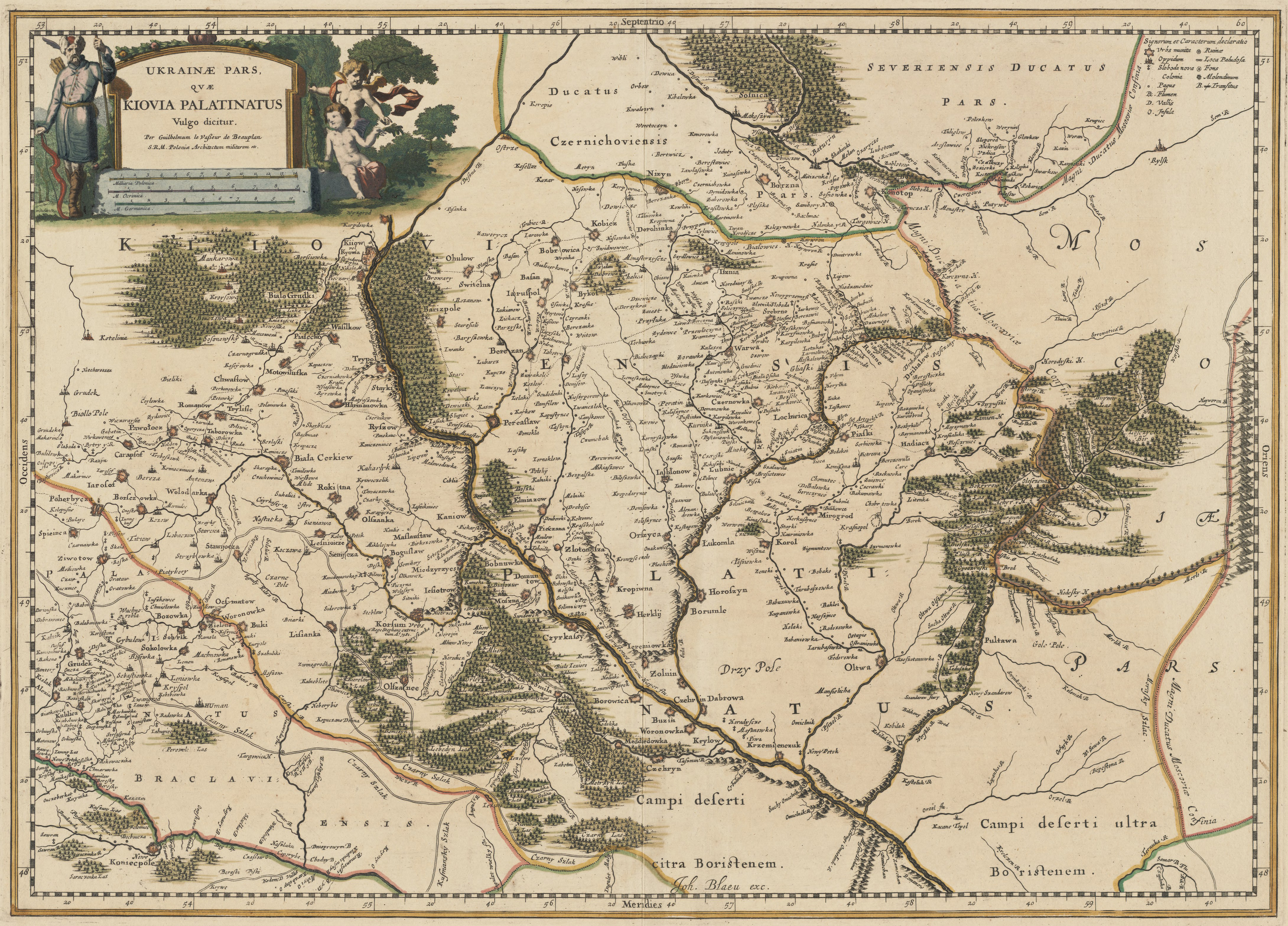
Ukrainae pars quae Kiovia Palatinatus vulgo dicitur, a modified version of sheets 3, 4, 7 and 8 of the Special Map, with north up, as published in Blaeu's Atlas Maior (1660s).

The means to [include detailed maps in this edition] had been deprived of [Beauplan] by the death of his engraver, Willem Hondius, by whom he had had all the plates engraved. The King of Poland took them from his widow, and since then he has had no knowledge of them. This is why all the valuable information has been lost, not without great regret, to prejudice the public who would have received extreme satisfaction from it.

While it is not clear how exactly recycled sheets of the Special Map under new names, as well as detailed maps of the river Borysthenes (Dnipro), ended up in the hands of Joan Blaeu in Amsterdam, who published them along with Beauplan's 1651 edition's text in various language editions of the Atlas Maior from 1662 onwards, it seems that Beauplan and Blaeu worked together directly. In the 1662 Latin and 1664 Dutch editions of the Atlas Maior, Beauplan's authorship of the maps is directly acknowledged, but in the 1665 and 1672 Spanish editions, his name is not mentioned at all. Krawciw and his fellow researchers in 1959 conjectured that Beauplan could not openly publish these maps – which were top secret due to the military situation in Ukraine – under his own name anymore, because he was tied to the Polish royal privilege, which had been taken away from him in 1654 and granted to Forster and Pastorius.

== Literature ==
- Kiebuzinski, Ksenya, ed. (2011). Through Foreign Latitudes & Unknown Tomorrows: Three Hundred Years of Ukrainian Émigré Political Culture (PDF). Toronto: University of Toronto. p. 104. ISBN 978-0-7727-6083-8. Archived from the original (PDF) on 3 August 2025.
- Plokhy, Serhii (2006). The Origins of the Slavic Nations: Premodern Identities in Russia, Ukraine, and Belarus (PDF). New York: Cambridge University Press. pp. 10–15. ISBN 978-0-521-86403-9. Archived (PDF) from the original on 6 June 2011.
- Pernal, A. B.; Essar, D. F. (1985). "The 1652 Beauplan Maps of the Ukraine". Harvard Ukrainian Studies. 9 (1/2). Harvard Ukrainian Research Institute: 61–84. ISSN 0363-5570. JSTOR 41036133.
- Bagrow, Leo (1953). "The First Maps of the Dnieper Cataracts". Imago Mundi. 10. Taylor & Francis: 87–97. ISSN 0308-5694. JSTOR 1150146.
- Hervé, R.; Beauplan, Levasseur de (1963). "Levasseur de Beauplan's Maps of Normandy and Brittany". Imago Mundi. 17. Taylor & Francis: 73–75. ISSN 0308-5694. JSTOR 1150353.
- Vavrychyn, Maria (2000). Комплекс карт України Ґ. Боплана та їх збереження в бібліотеках Європи [The Complex of Maps of Ukraine by G. Beauplan and Their Preservation in European Libraries]. Картографія та історія України [Cartography and History of Ukraine] (in Ukrainian). Vol. З. Lviv and Kyiv, Ukraine; New York: M. P. Kot.
- Krawciw, Bohdan (1959). "Guillaume le Vasseur Sieur de Beauplan's "Description of Ukraine" and his military maps of Ukraine — By Bohdan Krawciw" (PDF). A Description of Ukraine, by Guillaume le Vasseur Sieur de Beauplan. New York: Organization for Defense of Four Freedoms for Ukraine. pp. IX–XII.
