= Jaroslav Rudnyckyj =

Ukrainian-Canadian linguist (1910–1995)

- Ярослав-Богдан Антонович Рудницький
- Born: November 28, 1910; Przemyśl, Kingdom of Galicia and Lodomeria, Austria-Hungary (now Poland)
- Died: October 19, 1995 (aged 84); Montreal, Quebec, Canada
- Education: University of Lviv
- Occupations: Academic; scholar; writer
- Spouse: Maryna Antonovych-Rudnycka
- Writing career
- Language: Ukrainian, English, German
- Subjects: Linguistics; lexicography with a specialty in etymology and onomastics
- Notable work: Etymological Dictionary of the Ukrainian Language (1962–1982)
- Notable awards: Order of Canada

Jaroslav-Bohdan Antonovyč Rudnyckyj (Note: Also transliterated as Yaroslav, Rudnytskyi or Rudnytsky) OC (Ukrainian: Ярослав-Богдан Антонович Рудницький, pronounced [jɐroˈslɑu̯ boɦˈdɑn rʊdˈnɪtsʲkɪj]; November 28, 1910 – October 19, 1995) was a Ukrainian-Canadian linguist and lexicographer with a specialty in etymology and onomastics, folklorist, bibliographer, travel writer, and publicist.

== Career ==
Born in Przemyśl, Habsburg Galicia, in what is today eastern Poland near the border with Ukraine, he received his M.A. in Slavistics in 1934 and his Ph.D. (under Witold Taszycki) in this same field in 1937 from the University of Lviv. From 1938 to 1940, he was Research Associate at the Ukrainian Scientific Institute in Berlin. From 1941 to 1945 he was a professor at the Ukrainian Free University in Prague and he taught at the University of Heidelberg from 1945 to 1948.

In 1949 he emigrated to Canada where he organized and became head of the Department of Slavic Studies at the University of Manitoba. He stayed there until his retirement in 1976. With the historian, Dmytro Doroshenko and the literary scholar, Leonid Biletsky, he was a co-founder of the Canadian branch of the Ukrainian Free Academy of Sciences which is located in Winnipeg. He became the third president (1955–1970).

== Philologist ==
His books include The Ukrainian Language and Its Dialects, in Ukrainian, (1937; 5th revised ed. 1978), a German-language textbook of Ukrainian (1940; 4th ed. 1964), A Modern Ukrainian Grammar for English speakers (reprinted seven times — 1st ed. 1949; 7th ed. 1978), and a pioneering but incomplete English-language Etymological Dictionary of the Ukrainian Language (2 volumes in 22 fascicles, 1962–1982). He also produced several smaller Ukrainian language books on the origins of various Ukrainian placenames including Galicia, Volhynia, and Ukraine. As well, he wrote on Canadian, especially Manitoban, placenames of Ukrainian origin.

During the Second World War, he published a short Ukrainian-German Dictionary which went through four editions: (1940; 1941; 1942; and 1943). Together with Zenon Kuzelia, he also published a much larger Ukrainian-German Dictionary (1943; reprinted 1983). (It contained over 100,000 words.)

== Travel writer ==
Among his Ukrainian language books are "Travels Across Half the World" (1955), "Travels Through America" (1956), and "Travels Through Canada" (1959?).

== Folklorist ==
The source collection titled Ukrainian-Canadian Folklore and Dialectological Texts was published in Ukrainian in several volumes beginning in 1956. One volume appeared in English translation.

During the Cold War, he was concerned about the fate of the Ukrainian language under Soviet rule, and, comparing its situation with that of other languages under political pressure, noted the concept of "linguicide".

After his retirement from the University of Manitoba and his move to Montreal, he became active in the emigre government of the Ukrainian People's Republic which had been forced from the territory of Ukraine in 1920 by its rival Soviet government.

== Canadiana ==
From 1963 to 1971, Rudnyckyj was a member of the Canadian Royal Commission on Bilingualism and Biculturalism. The commission led to the promulgation of the new policy of "Multiculturalism" and the Official Languages Act by the federal government of Canada.

In 1992, he was made an Officer of the Order of Canada.

== Legacy ==
Rudnyckyj's bibliography, was published in four parts beginning in 1975; the last part was published in 1995 under the title J.B. Rudnyckyj: Repertorium Bibliographicum Addenda 1984–1994.
