= Institute of Ukrainian Archeography =

Ukrainian institute

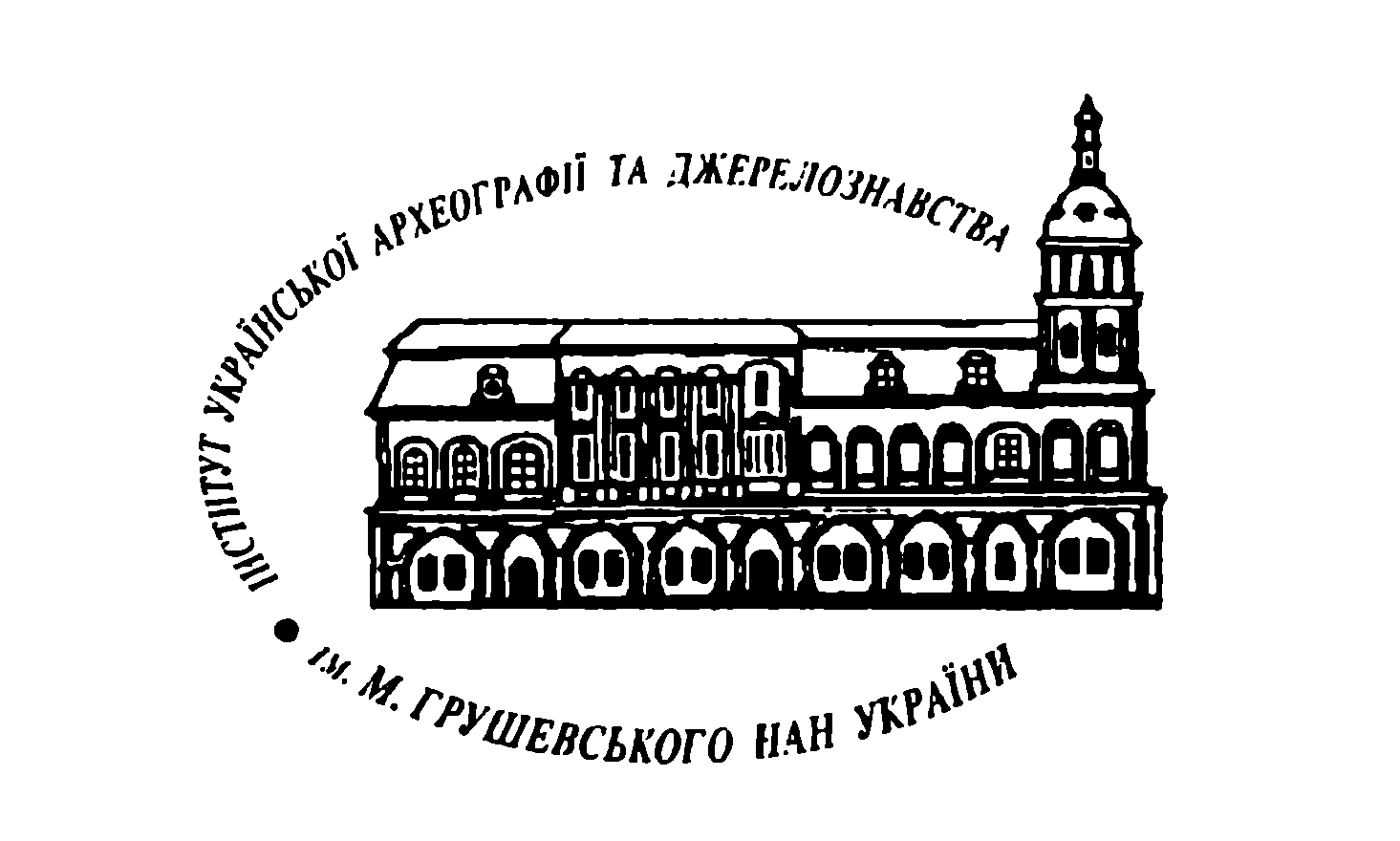
Logo of the Institute

The Institute of Ukrainian Archeography and Source Studies of the National Academy of Sciences of Ukraine is a historical institute based in Kyiv, Ukraine, and part of the National Academy of Sciences of Ukraine. It was established in 1990, and publishes a number of research studies focused on historical topics, such as Upokorennya holodom, a collection of sources on the Ukrainian famine.

It is named after Mykhailo Hrushevsky. One of its prominent researchers was Maria Vavrychyn, who specialised in the cartography of Ukraine, particularly in the works of Guillaume Le Vasseur de Beauplan (mid-17th century).
