= Mszana, Podkarpackie Voivodeship =

Mszana
- Village
- Location within Poland
- Coordinates: 49°29′39″N 21°38′48″E
- Country: Poland
- Voivodeship: Subcarpathian
- County: Krosno
- Gmina: Dukla
- Population: 310

Mszana [ˈmʂana] is a village in the administrative district of Gmina Dukla, within Krosno County, Subcarpathian Voivodeship, in south-eastern Poland, close to the border with Slovakia.

The population of Mszana in the Podkarpackie region was about 250–273 people in the 2021.
