= Guillaume Le Vasseur de Beauplan =

French-Polish cartographer, engineer and architect (d. 1673)

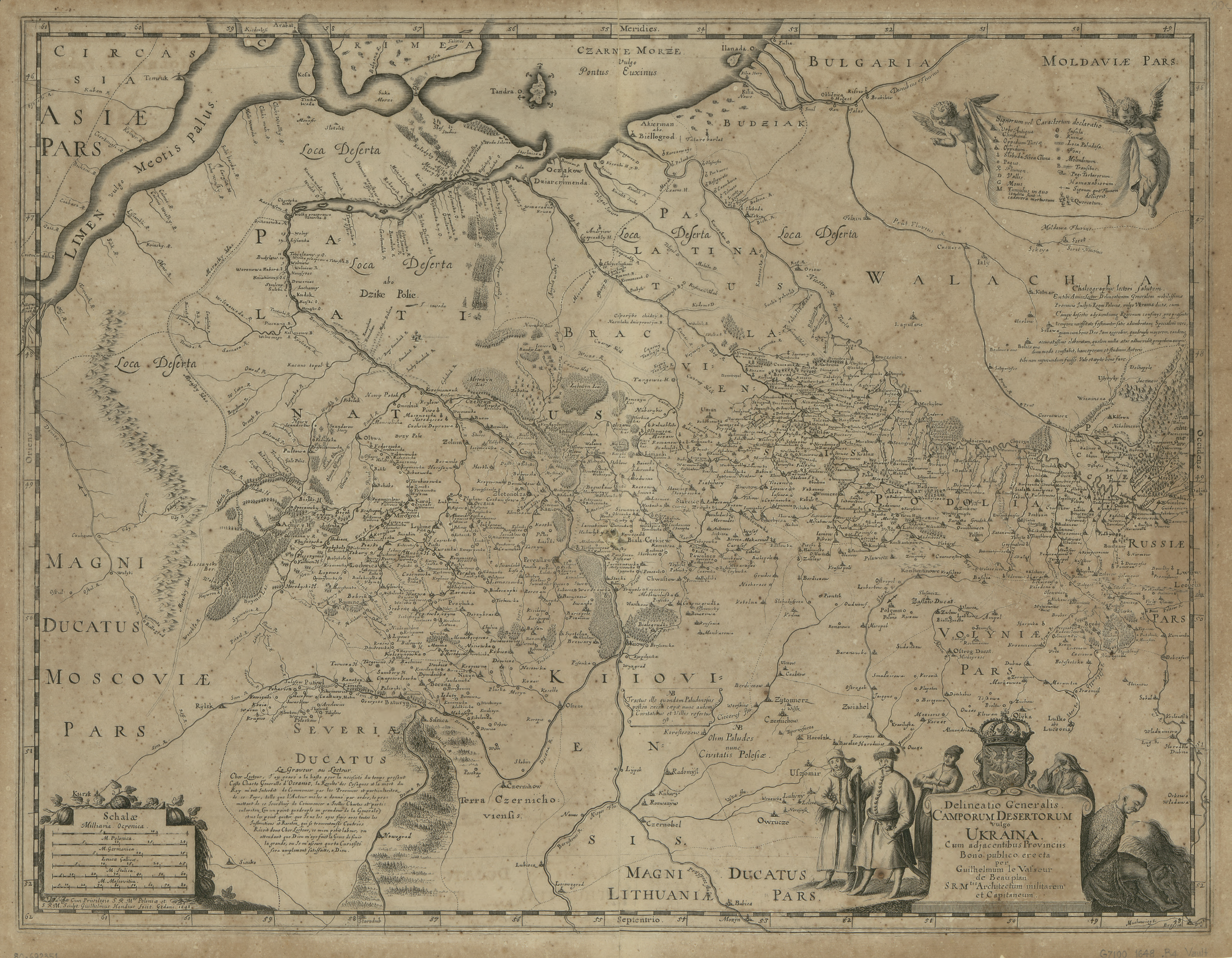
General Map of the Wild Fields, in common speech Ukraine, with adjacent Provinces, Beauplan (1648). South is up.

Guillaume Levasseur de Beauplan (c. 1600 – 6 December 1673) or William le Vasseur de Beauplan was a French-Polish cartographer, engineer and architect.

Beauplan is best known for his 1648 General Map of Ukraine and other maps of Ukraine (which he spelt as Ukranie or Vkranie, with the "U" spelt as a "V"), and his 1660 book Description d'Ukranie ("Description of Ukraine"), first published in 1651 as Description des contrés du Royaume de Pologne ("Description of the Kingdom of Poland's Lands"), which was republished and translated many times in Western European languages throughout the rest of the 17th century and the entire 18th century.

== Career ==
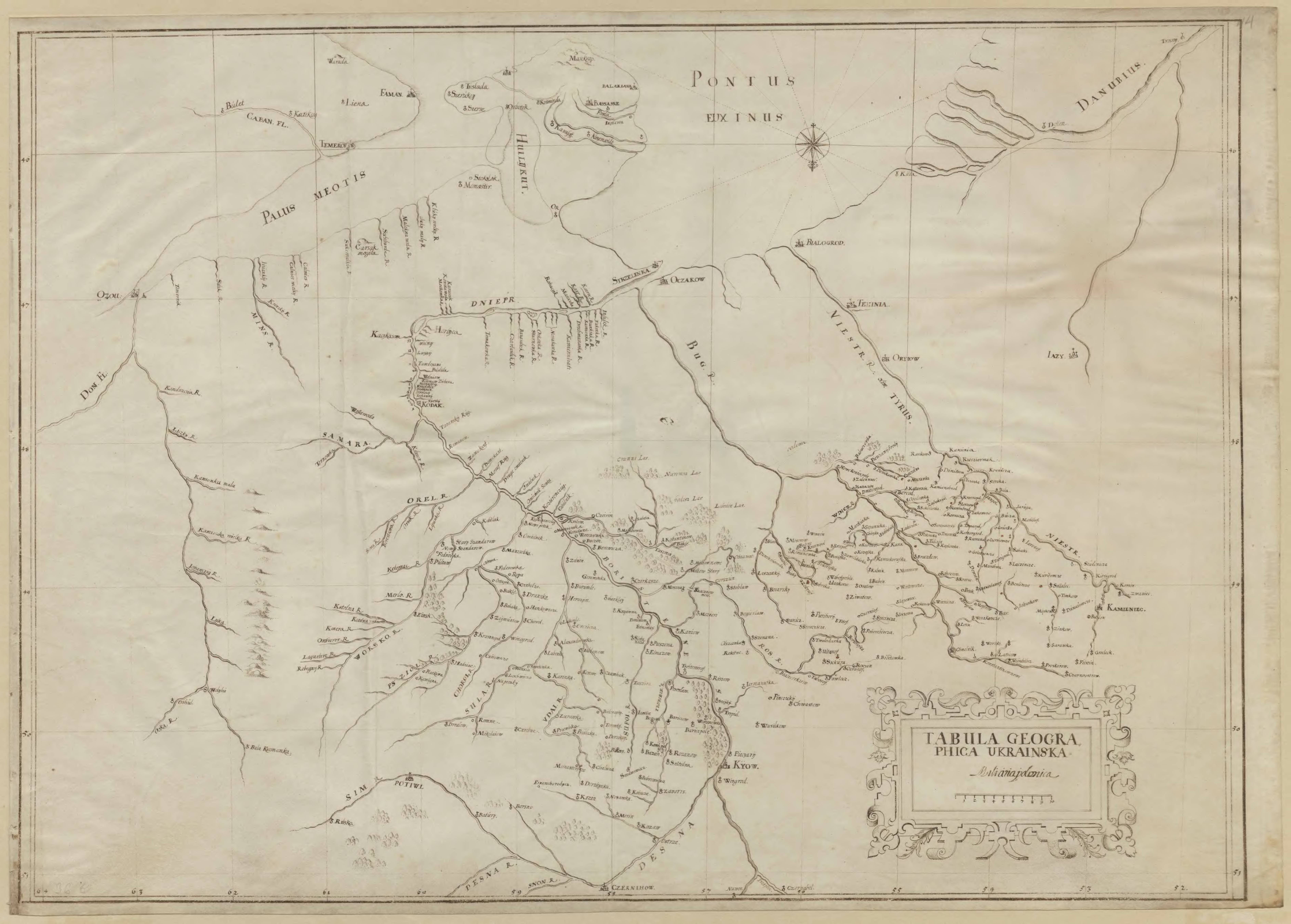
Beauplan's 1639 hand-drawn Tabula Geographica Ukrainska became the basis of his 1648 General Map of Ukraine.

Beauplan served as artillery captain for the army of the Crown of the Kingdom of Poland between 1630 and 1647 or 1648. He was sent to Ukraine where he served under Stanisław Koniecpolski in 1637–1638. He used his architectural skills while in the military. In 1639, he was involved in the rebuilding of the Kodak Fortress. He also built a fortress at Bar, worked on Brody Castle, and structures in Kremenchuk.

== General Map of Ukraine ==
In 1639, Beauplan created the first "descriptive" map of Ukraine. He created the General Map of Ukraine in 1648 that had detailed border information. By 1654 he was working in Gdańsk (Danzig). He created a map with a scale of 1:452,000 and an additional map scaled at 1:1,800,000. Both maps were engraved by Willem Hondius. These maps would go on to be published in Rouen, France and reproduced by Benjamin Cordt. Beauplan published the Special Map of Ukraine in the 1650s, and another map of the Dnieper River in 1662.

== Description of Ukraine ==
Title page of Description of Ukraine (1660). Click for full PDF.

Beauplan wrote the Description des contrés du Royaume de Pologne ("Description of the Kingdom of Poland's Lands"), which was published in 1651. It was renamed Description d'Ukranie ("Description of Ukraine"), when the second, revised edition was released in 1660. The book became the best-known and most frequently re-edited and translated 17th-century source that provided a geographical, economic, cultural, societal and demographic description of Ukraine. In the book, Ukraine was described as a territory between Muscovy and Transylvania. At least 26 editions in at least nine different languages were published from 1651 to 1981. It has seen ongoing prints ever since.

Essar & Pernal (1990) found that the original 1651 edition had two parts: introductory materials and Ukraine. Part 2 about Ukraine discussed the following topics: Kiev (modern Kyiv), the Cossacks (in two chapters), nobles, peasants, other cities and environs, Crimea and the Crimean Tatars, customs, medicine, fauna, and a conclusion. The revised and expanded edition of 1660 had three parts: part 1 had slightly different introductory materials (8 pages); part 2 was about Ukraine (88.5 pages), with added chapters about climate and Easter celebrations; and a new part 3 was added about Poland (24.5 pages, about royal institutions; the Polish nobility; military equipment; banquets; and a conclusion).

=== Editions of Description d'Ukranie ===
Essar & Pernal (1982) found the following 26 editions of Beauplan's Description d'Ukranie, including the original 1651 edition and versions of it:

1. Beauplan: Rouen 1651 (French)
2. Beauplan: Rouen 1660 (French)
3. Beauplan: Rouen 1661 (French)
4. Blaeu: Amsterdam 1662 (Latin)
5. Blaeu: Amsterdam 1663 (French)
6. Blaeu: Amsterdam 1664 (Dutch)
7. Blaeu: Amsterdam 1665 (Spanish)
8. Blaeu: Amsterdam 1667 (French)
9. Blaeu: Amsterdam 1672 (Spanish)
10. Beauplan: Rouen 1673 (French)
11. Churchill: London 1704 (English)
12. Churchill: London 1732 (English)
13. Churchill: London 1744 (English)
14. Churchill: London 1752 (English)
15. Mizler von Kolof: Warsaw 1769 (Latin)
16. Moeller: Wrocław 1780 (German)
17. Niemcewicz: Warsaw 1822 (Polish)
18. Ustrialov: St. Petersburg 1832 (Russian)
19. Niemcewicz: Leipzig 1839 (Polish)
20. Galitzin: Paris 1861 (French)
21. Antonovich: Kiev 1896 (Russian)
22. Liaskoronskii: Kiev 1901 (Russian)
23. Petryshyn: New York 1959 (English)
24. Blaeu: Amsterdam 1967 (French)
25. Wójcik: Warsaw 1972 (Polish)
26. Isaievych: Lviv 1981 (Ukrainian)

== Bibliography ==
- Essar, D. F.; Pernal, A. B. (1982). "Beauplan's "Description d'Ukranie": A Bibliography of Editions and Translations". Harvard Ukrainian Studies. 6 (4). Harvard Ukrainian Research Institute: 485–499. ISSN 0363-5570. JSTOR 41036007.
- Essar, Dennis F.; Pernal, Andrew B. (1990). "The First Edition (1651) of Beauplan's Description d'Ukranie". Harvard Ukrainian Studies. 14 (1/2). Harvard Ukrainian Research Institute: 84–96. ISSN 0363-5570. JSTOR 41036356.
- Plokhy, Serhii (2006). The Origins of the Slavic Nations: Premodern Identities in Russia, Ukraine, and Belarus (PDF). New York: Cambridge University Press. pp. 10–15. ISBN 978-0-521-86403-9. Archived (PDF) from the original on 6 June 2011.
