= Willem Hondius =

Dutch engraver, cartographer and painter

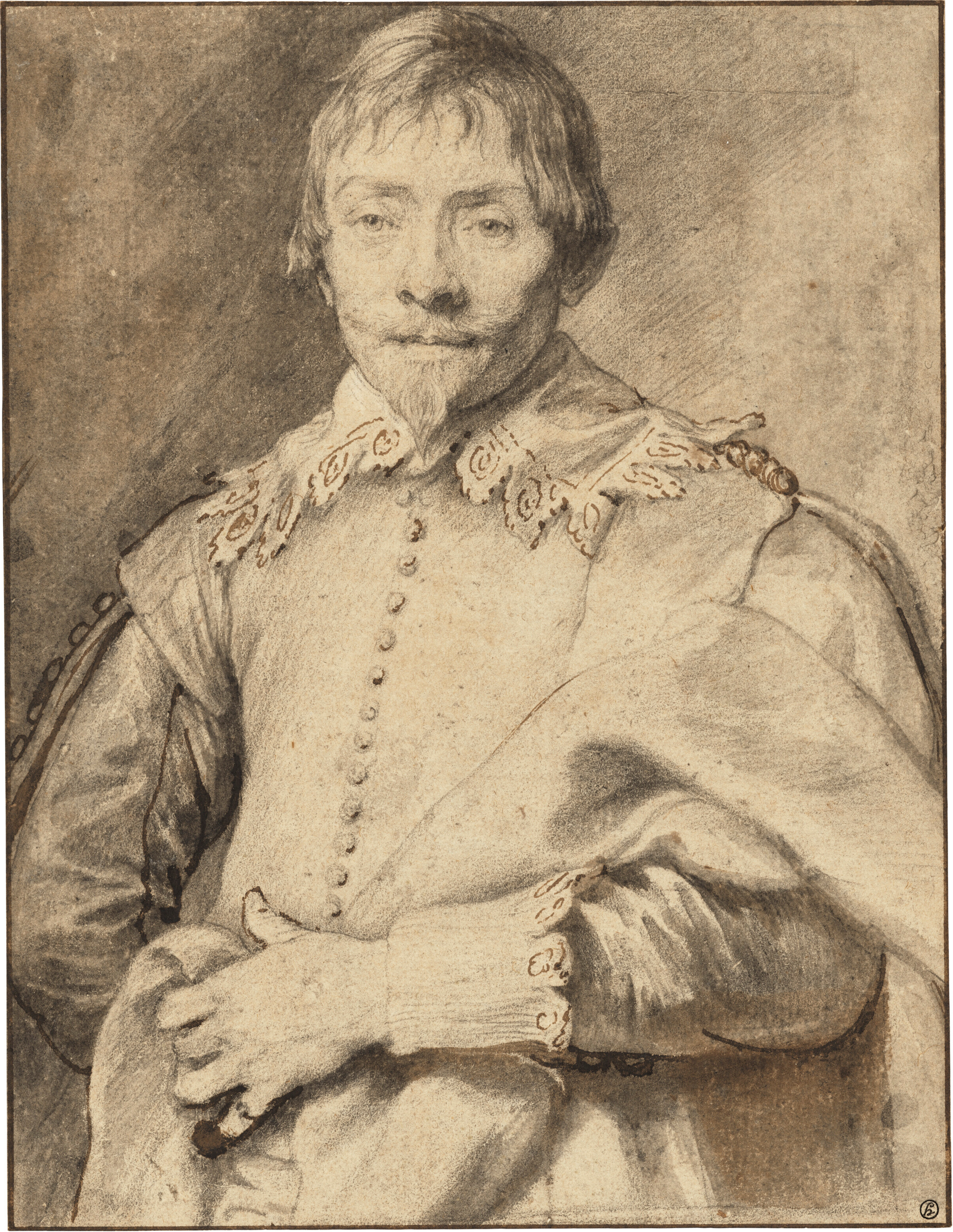
- Portrait of Willem Hondius by Anthony van Dyck
- Born: c. 1598; The Hague
- Died: 1652 or 1658; Danzig (Gdańsk)
- Known for: Engraving
- Movement: Baroque
- Patrons: Władysław IV Vasa, John II Casimir

Willem Hondius or Willem Hondt (c. 1598 in The Hague – 1652 or 1658 in Danzig (Gdańsk)) was a Dutch engraver, cartographer and painter who spent most of his life in Poland.

== Life ==
Willem Hondius was one of seven children of Hendrik Hondius the Elder (1573 – c. 1649) and Sara Jansdochter. His father was one of the most important Dutch reproductive printmakers and publishers in the early 17th century. A connection with the Hondius family of cartographers in Amsterdam is possible but has not been established.

In 1636, Willem visited Danzig in Poland. In 1641, he moved there from The Hague for good.

Hondius was supported at the royal court of King Władysław IV Waza. The King awarded him the title of Chalcographus privilegialus (privileged engraver) and Chalcographus Regius (Royal engraver).

He was married twice, first in 1632 in The Hague to Kornelia van den Enden, secondly in 1646 in Danzig to Anna Mackensen, daughter of the Royal Goldsmith.

In August 1651, in the wake of the Khmelnytsky Uprising, Hondius joined the army of Janusz Radziwiłł conquering Kiev. The first ever portrait of the famous Cossack leader Bohdan Khmelnytsky was engraved during this campaign.

Nothing is known of Hondius after 1652, though he may have lived until 1658.
