= Radziwiłł map =

Latin map of the Grand Duchy of Lithuania

High resolution main section of the Radziwiłł map

Magni Ducatus Lithuaniae, (Note: Full title: Magni Ducatus Lithuaniae caeterumque regionum illi adiaciencium exacta descriptio (Exact description of the Grand Duchy of Lithuania and its neighbouring territories).) or simply the Radziwiłł map, is a Latin map of the Grand Duchy of Lithuania created under the tutelage of Mikołaj Krzysztof "the Orphan" Radziwiłł. The map was likely first published in 1603 but no surviving copy is known. It was published in the Amsterdam printing house of Willem Blaeu as a wall map from 1613 to 1650s. It was also included in atlases published by Blaeu as a foldable insert in 1631–1649. In 1649, the map was redrawn to shrink it so it could fit on an atlas page. Valued for its accuracy and intricate detail, the map was modified and republished many times by various cartographers until the First partition of the Polish–Lithuanian Commonwealth in 1772.

== History ==
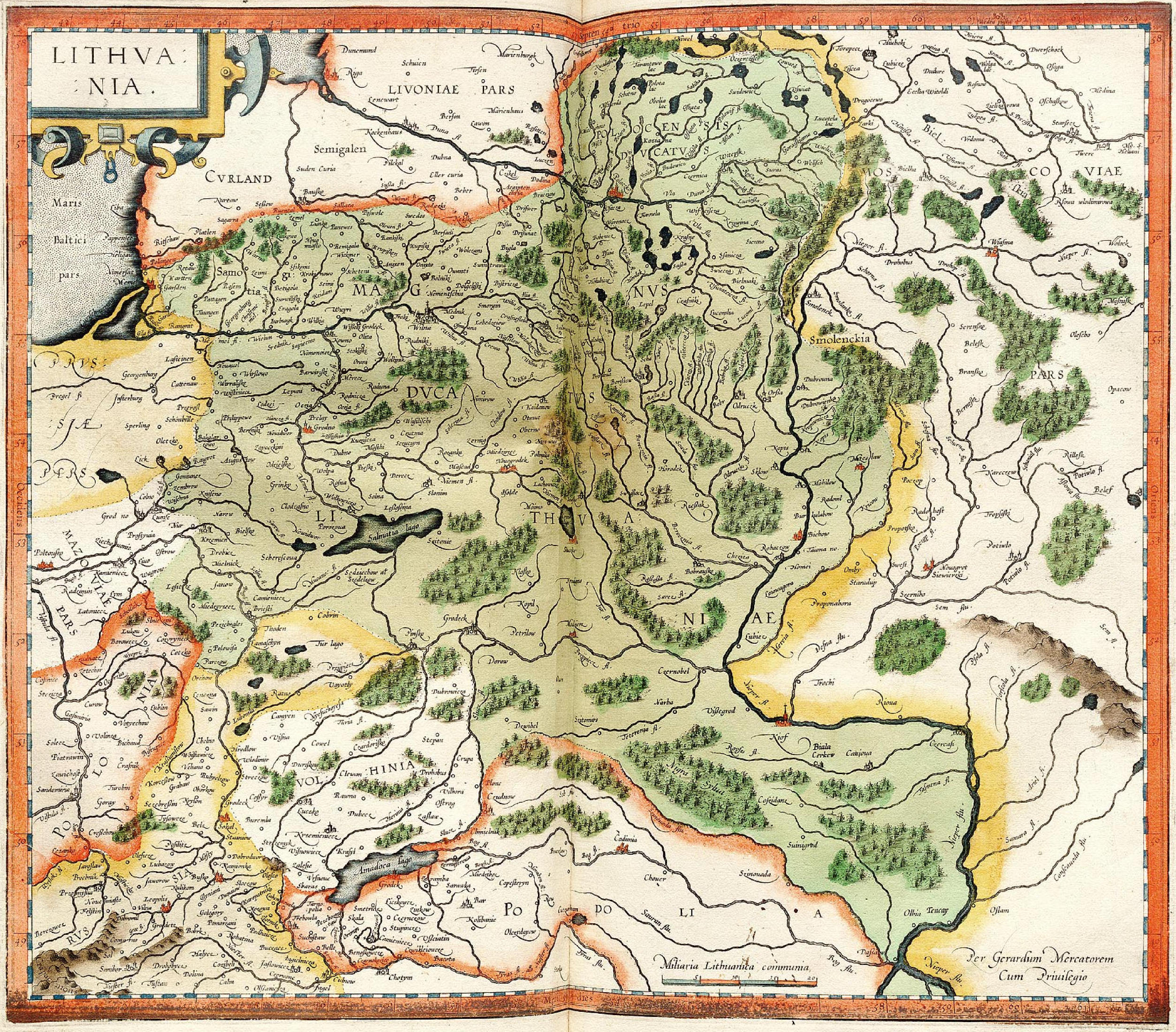
Mercator's map of 1595

The earliest maps of the Grand Duchy of Lithuania depict it together with other regions of Eastern or Northern Europe, particularly with Russia or Poland. The first map depicting only the Grand Duchy was printed by Gerardus Mercator in an atlas in 1595. The map indicated 73 settlements, nine named rivers, and 15 unnamed but identifiable rivers and four unnamed but identifiable lakes in the territory of present-day Lithuania.

A member of the powerful Radziwiłł family, Mikołaj Krzysztof "the Orphan" Radziwiłł (1549–1616) was Grand Marshal of Lithuania (1578–1586), Voivode of Trakai (1590–1604), and Voivode of Vilnius (1604–1616). Having studied at universities in western Europe, including in Strasbourg and Paris, and having travelled on a pilgrimage to the Holy Land in 1582–1584, he understood the need for accurate maps and became interested in the creation of a map according to the contemporary standards of mapmaking.

Around 1590, he started work on creating a new map using land measurement data from the Volok Reform launched in 1557. Radziwiłł also likely employed military cartographers who worked on maps during the Livonian War. A surviving letter by Radziwiłł shows that he was actively involved in the mapmaking process and was not merely a sponsor. The team included Kiev Voivode Konstanty Ostrogski, English mathematician Jakub Bosgrave, artist Tomasz Makowski, cartographer Maciej Strubicz, bishop of Kiev Józef Wereszczyński. However, more precise information about the map's creation is lacking due to the destruction and scattering of the Radziwiłł archives. In particular, Makowski's role is confused – some earlier authors name him as the author of the entire map. However, that is likely a result of confusion with Makowski's map of 1614 ( Lithuaniae Tabula) of which no known copies exist. The map was completed around 1600.

The map was used as the data source for many other maps of Eastern Europe, including maps by Henricus Hondius II (c. 1633), Johann Pleitner (1634), Guillaume Le Vasseur de Beauplan (1651), Nicolas Sanson (1655), Cornelis Visscher (1685), Carel Allard (1697), Frederik de Wit (c. 1710), Jan Nieprzecki (1749), Johan Kanter (1770), Giovanni Antonio Rizzi Zannoni (1772), Tobias Conrad Lotter (1780).

== Publication ==
Researchers believe that the map was first published in 1603, but no surviving copies are known. The map is known to have existed based on the surviving correspondence. A surviving letter from 1599 by Maciej Strubicz shows that he wanted to hire a local goldsmith Joannes Kolner in Gdańsk to engrave the map. A letter from 1604 shows that 40 copies of the map were ordered in Augsburg. Another letter shows that Radziwiłł sent a copy of the map to Eustachy Wołłowicz in May 1604 who at the time was in Augsburg. Unfortunately, no copies of Makowski's map have survived. In 1613, a new map was prepared and engraved by Hessel Gerritsz at Willem Jansz Blaeu's publishing house in Amsterdam, presumably based on the map prepared by Makowski. It is known that Makowski's map was already in Willem Blaeu's publishing house in 1608.

The 1613 map was engraved by Hessel Gerritsz on four copperplates and published by the leading cartographer Willem Jansz Blaeu in Amsterdam in 1613. It was first presented at the autumn Frankfurt Book Fair in 1613. It was a large wall map measuring 79 cm × 109.5 cm (31.1 in × 43.1 in) and printed as needed based on demand until 1631.

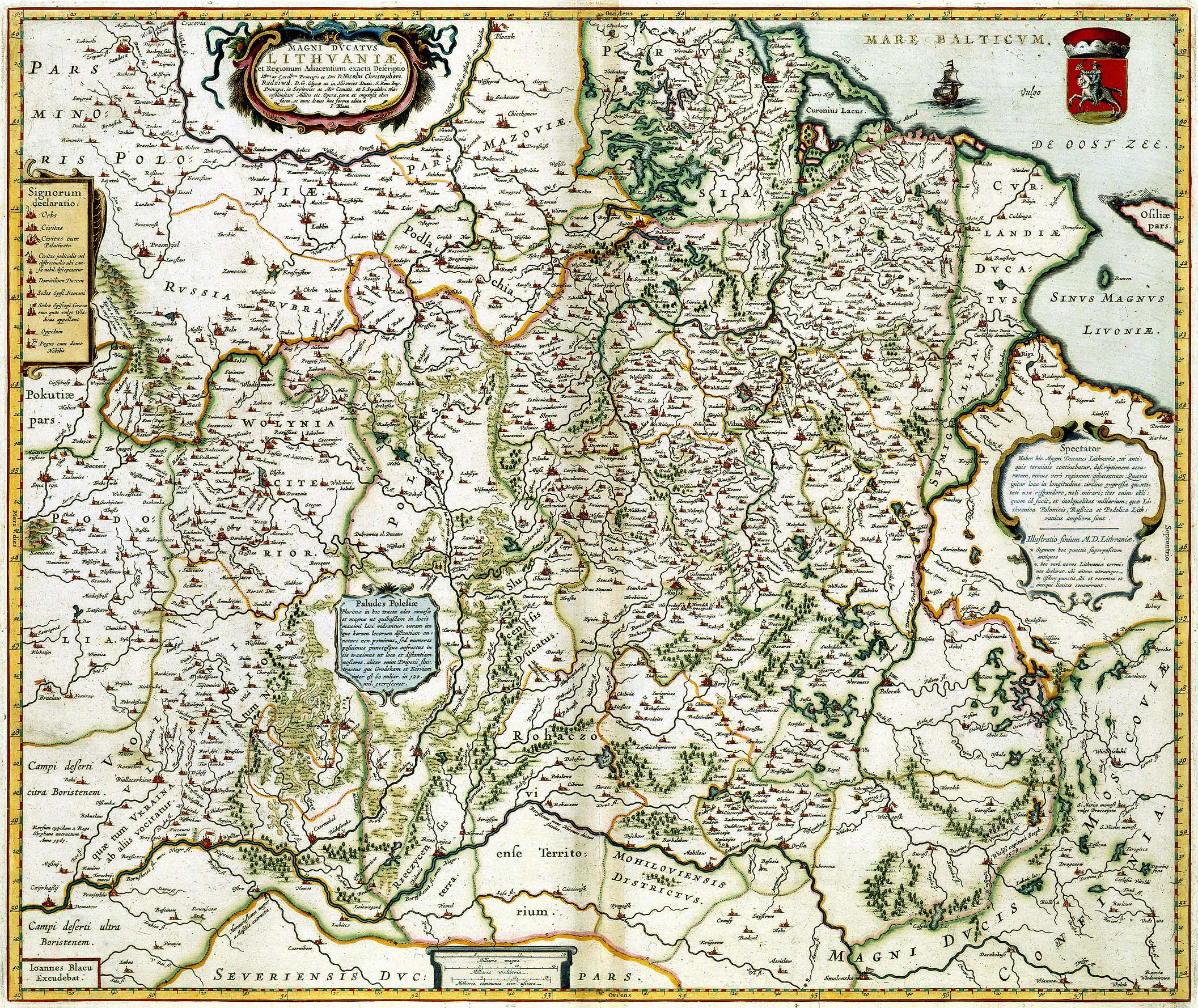
Reduced and rotated map first published in 1649

In 1631, Blaeu included it in his atlas Appendix Theatri A. Ortelii et Atlantis G. Mercatoris. In the first edition, the map was published on four separate pages thus preventing a reader from seeing the entire map at once. A second edition from the same year corrected this by cutting off the copperplates with the diagram of the lower Dnieper – thus the entire map was now on six copper plates. The main map measuring 73 cm × 75 cm (29 in × 30 in) was then added as a foldable loose-leaf insert. The Dnieper diagram was printed in the atlas separately. The atlas also included Descriptio Lituaniae, a 7-page Latin description of the geography and history of the Grand Duchy of Lithuania, and 1.5-page Latin description by Tomasz Makowski that is sometimes included at the bottom of the wall map. The longer description was based on the chronicle by Alexander Guagnini first published in 1578.

Such atlases were printed in 1631–1649. About 20 editions of Blaeu atlases are known that include the Radziwiłł map. During the time, wall maps continued to be printed as well. In 1649, the map was re-engraved by Blaeu's son Joan – it was shrunk to 44 cm × 52 cm (17 in × 20 in) and oriented west instead of north so that it could fit on an atlas page. In 1660, the original map was included in the Klencke Atlas. The map was also included in a counterfeit German atlas published c. 1670.

Blaeu's printing shop burned down in 1672. It is likely that the copperplates to the map were lost in this fire.

== Content ==
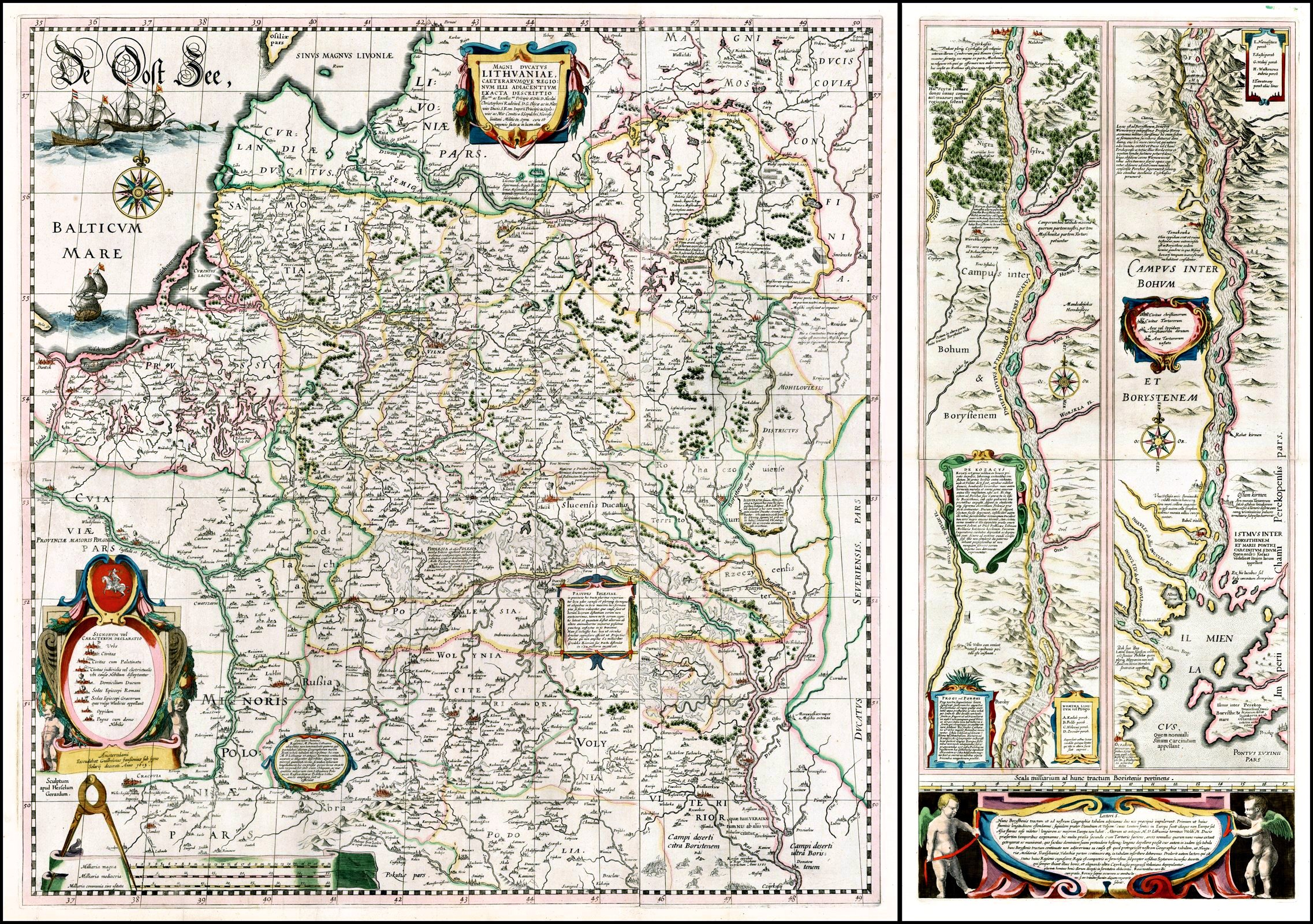
Map including the two-part diagram of the lower Dnieper river, but not including the descriptive text at the bottom

The map has three major parts: map of the Grand Duchy of Lithuania, two-part diagram of the lower Dnieper, and a lengthy Latin geographical and ethnological description of the Grand Duchy at the bottom.

=== Main map ===
==== Territory and geography ====
The map depicts the territory from the Gulf of Riga in the north to Podolia in the south, from the Vistula river in the west to the border with the Grand Duchy of Moscow beyond the Dnieper river in the east. The map shows borders of the Grand Duchy of Lithuania and its administrative subdivisions (voivodeships and powiats). The map was the first map to indicate terms Ukraine and Cossacks. The territory of Ukraine (also labeled as Outer Volhynia or Lower Dnieper) spanned from Kiev in the north to Korsun in the south. Steppes further south are labeled "Campi deserti" (Wild Fields).

As usual for maps of the period, there are no roads indicated. However, the map indicates several key bridges and explanatory notes indicated that the map would notate roads and distances across the vast marshes in Polesia, but such markings are lacking in the actual map. The map features a detailed network of major rivers and their tributaries. For example, the Neman basin shows a total of 97 rivers. In total, the map shows some 1,800 rivers. This was a result of increased grain trade with western Europe and the need for more precise river maps for navigation. The waterbodies were not shown consistently. For example, some large lakes are missing but small lakes and rivulets relevant for possible trade routes are clearly marked. The rivers are also shown much too wide and their course often only approximate. For example, the origin of Lėvuo is clearly mistaken.

==== Settlements ====
The 1613 map is noted for a particularly dense network of settlements – it noted 2.7 times more settlements than the earlier map by Mercator. The map included all settlements with more than 300–350 residents. In total, 1,020 settlements are marked on the map. Of these, 511 towns, 31 villages, and one monastery were within the territory of the Grand Duchy of Lithuania. The settlements are divided into nine categories based on number of residents and their administrative (royal, church, or nobility) jurisdiction. The map indicated all cities and towns as well as villages that had a residence of the nobility. The names of the settlements were written in Latin based on Polish pronunciation.

The settlements were indicated not only with dots for geographical accuracy but also with miniature depictions of their most prominent architectural features that could serve as visual identification for a traveler. The dense network of settlements served not only the practical purpose but was also as a visual repudiation of a frequent description of the Grand Duchy of Lithuania as a sparsely inhabited land of great forests and swamps.

==== Precision ====
The map uses pseudocylindrical map projection and is drawn at the scale M 1:1,293,000. This scale is expressed in three different military bar scales using 7.4 km (4.6 mi), 6.4 km (4.0 mi), and 5.5 km (3.4 mi) intervals. The map counts the longitude based on the Ferro meridian.

The map is valued for its high precision. In his dissertation in 1957, Vaclovas Chomskis calculated the mean squared error of coordinates at ±13.5' to 13.8'. The accuracy was greatest in Minsk and Novogrudok Voivodeships and lowest in Samogitia and Trakai Voivodeship. For comparison, in Mercator's map from 1595, the mean squared error was ±30.4' for latitude coordinates and ±62.2' for longitude coordinates. Chomskis' study shows that maps published as late as 1770 had similar accuracy as the Radziwiłł's map. Juozas Andrius compared locations of 70 settlements and concluded that they are shown within 36 km (22 mi) from their actual locations or within 2.8 centimetres (1.1 in) on the map.

==== Notes and explanations ====
The map features longer explanatory texts in decorative cartouches and smaller notes. Some notes addressed difficulties in obtaining accurate measurements, others reinforced Lithuanian positions in the various territorial disputes with Poland, Grand Duchy of Moscow, or the Crimean Khanate. The map also depicted the borders of the Grand Duchy of Lithuania as they were prior to the Union of Lublin (1569) and after – a reflection of the continued dissatisfaction among the Lithuanian nobility with the territorial transfers to Poland.

The map also highlighted Lithuanian victories against the Grand Duchy of Moscow in the battles of Orsha (1514), Ula (1564), and Polotsk (1579). A miniature depicted groups of horsemen fighting each other between Vitebsk and Smolensk with an explanation that these are Lithuanians stopping Russian attacks. These notes clearly indicated that Moscow was Lithuania's most dangerous enemy.

Other notes were more historical, for example noting surrender of the Livonian Order which led to the Treaty of Vilnius (1559) or the founding of Korsun by King Stephen Báthory in 1581.

=== Diagram of the Dnieper ===
The map includes a two-part diagram of the lower Dnieper river from Cherkasy to its mouth at the Black Sea. The scale of this map is approximately M 1:530,000. Only the delta is depicted more accurately; the rest of the river is more schematic.

According to the explanation given on the map, the diagram was included to showcase the third longest river in Europe and historical borders of the Grand Duchy of Lithuania. The territory, known as the Wild Fields, was briefly conquered by Grand Duke Vytautas (ruled 1392–1430) and the map pays him a tribute – Balneum Vitoldi (Vytautas' bath) is marked twice on the map.

The diagram has plentiful of notes about the region and its history, including description of the Dnieper Rapids and Khortytsia, the Scythians and Cossacks, and various destroyed cities and fortresses. Overall, the map depicts Cossacks as warriors protecting the borders of the Polish–Lithuanian Commonwealth against the attacks and slave raids of the Crimean Khanate.

=== Latin description ===
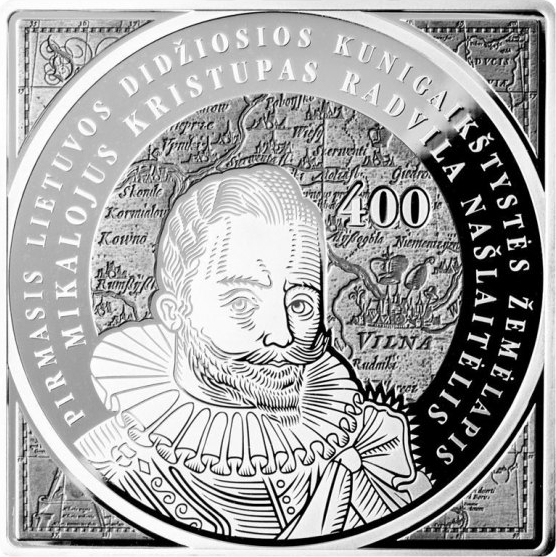
Commemorative coin of 100 Lithuanian litas for the 400th anniversary of the map

Only two surviving copies, kept at the Uppsala University Library in Sweden and Duchess Anna Amalia Library in Weimar, have the Latin description. The Uppsala copy was discovered by Ludwik Birkenmajer in 1913 and sparked great interest in the map. This copy was long hailed as the "original" map but later research revealed that it was published after 1631. This copy measures 92 cm × 112 cm (36 in × 44 in). The Weimar copy was discovered by Günter Schilder in 1984. It was printed before 1631.

The text was signed by T.M. which researchers identified as Tomasz Makowski and is dated 1613. However, it appears that the text was not originally meant to be included with the map.

The text worked in tandem with the map to combat the stereotype that Lithuania was an uncivilized land of thick forests and bogs. The text opened with an acknowledgement that foreign authors spread a lot of misinformation about the Grand Duchy and then attempted to disprove most popular notions. For example, forests were described not as a symbol of wilderness, but as a very useful natural resource. The map contained a note about marshes in Polesia – as if it attempted to contain the "forest and bogs" stereotype to just one region of the Grand Duchy. The map also minimized and avoided marking forests and bogs. For example, Rūdninkai forest is not marked.

== Bibliography ==
- Adamovitch, Aliaksei (2020). "On specifying the date of the map of the Grand Duchy of Lithuania of 1613".
- Adamovitch, Aliaksei (2021). "Map of the Grand Duchy of Lithuania at the Frankfurt Book Fair in 1613".
- Adamovitch, Aliaksei (2022). "O doprecyzowaniu datowania Radziwiłłowskiej mapy Wielkiego Księstwa Litewskiego z roku 1613". Z dziejów kartografii (in Polish). XXIV (44): 149–174.
- Adamovitch, Aliaksei (2024). "Mapa radziwiłłowska jako źródło dla prezentacji terytorium Wielkiego Księstwa Litewskiego na mapie Europy Willema Blaeu'a (1608) = The Radziwiłł's map as a source for the presentation of the territory of the Grand Duchy of Lithuania on Willem Blaeu's map of Europe (1608)" (PDF). Z dziejów kartografii (in Polish). XXV (44): 189–211.
- Andrius, Juozas (December 1952). "Kunigaikščio Radvilos žemėlapis". Aidai (in Lithuanian). 10: 439–450.
- Bumblauskas, Alfredas (2013). "100 Litas Coin Dedicated to the 400th Anniversary of the Issuance of the First Map of the Grand Duchy of Lithuania" (PDF). Lithuanian Collectors Coins. Bank of Lithuania.
- Buczek, Karol (1982). The History of Polish Cartography from the 15th to the 18th Century. Meridian Publishing Company. ISBN 9060411463.
- Česnulevičius, Algimantas (2013). "M. K. Radvila map in Middle Europe mapping context of the XVII century". Geografija. 49 (2): 145–153. ISSN 1392-1096.
- Braziūnienė, Alma (2000). "Senosios kartografijos rinkiniai Lietuvoje". Knygotyra (in Lithuanian). 36: 34–53. ISSN 0204-2061.
- Braziūnienė, Alma (2019). "LDK 1613 m. žemėlapio laidos: istoriografinis aspektas". Knygotyra. 72: 62–89. doi:10.15388/Knygotyra.2019.72.21. ISSN 0204-2061. S2CID 199242255.
- Gliožaitis, Algirdas Antanas (2003). "Kunigaikščio. M. K. Radvilos Lietuvos Didžiosios Kunigaikštystės žemėlapio sudarymo ir leidybos analizė". Geodezijos darbai (in Lithuanian). XXIX (2): Ia–Ig. doi:10.1080/13921541.2003.10552992 (inactive 12 July 2025). ISSN 1392-1843.
- Gliožaitis, Algirdas Antanas (2013). "Kunigaikščio M. K. Radvilos žemėlapiui Magni Ducatus Lithuaniae - 400 metų". Gimtasai kraštas (in Lithuanian). 6: 70–82. ISSN 2029-0101.
- Gliožaitis, Algirdas Antanas (2020). "Švedijoje, Upsalos universiteto bibliotekoje, saugomas LDK sieninio žemėlapio egzempliorius". Gimtasai kraštas (in Lithuanian). 18. ISSN 2029-0101.
- Gudmantas, Kęstutis (2008). ""Miškų ir pelkių kraštas". Keletas pastabų apie Lietuvos įvaizdį XIII–XVII a. raštijoje" (PDF). Inter-studia Humanitatis (in Lithuanian). 7: 94–113. ISSN 1822-1114.
- Jovaiša, Liudas (2018). "Eustachijus Valavičius: neįvertinto herojaus curriculum vitae" (PDF). Bažnyčios istorijos studijos (in Lithuanian). 9: 82–167. ISSN 1392-0502.
- Kaišiadorių muziejus (6 May 2020). "1613 m. LDK žemėlapis". Kaišiadorių enciklopedija (in Lithuanian).
- Lukšaitė, Ingė; Matulevičius, Algirdas (26 January 2023) [2018]. "Mikalojus Kristupas Radvila Našlaitėlis". Visuotinė lietuvių enciklopedija (in Lithuanian). Mokslo ir enciklopedijų leidybos centras.
- Muzikevičius, Algimantas (2010). "Gerardo Merkatoriaus Lietuvos žemėlapio leidimai". Knygotyra (in Lithuanian). 55: 316–326. doi:10.15388/kn.v55i0.3479. ISSN 0204-2061.
- Petrulis, Jokimas (1964). "Kai kurie Lietuvos istorinės geografijos klausimai praeities kartografinės medžiagos šviesoje". Geodezijos darbai (in Lithuanian). 2 (1): 103–127. doi:10.1080/13921843.1964.10553041. ISSN 1392-1843.
- Petrulis, Jokimas (1965). "Kai kurie geografiniai elementai 1613 m. "Magni Ducatus Lithuaniae" žemėlapyje". Geodezijos darbai (in Lithuanian). 3 (1): 103–127. doi:10.1080/13921843.1965.10553059. ISSN 1392-1843.
- Petrulis, Jokimas (1968). "Lietuvos pajūrio hidrografinis tinklas 1613 m. "Magni Ducatus Lithuaniae" žemėlapyje". Geodezijos darbai (in Lithuanian). 4 (1): 173–196. doi:10.1080/13921843.1968.10553082. ISSN 1392-1843.
- Plokhy, Serhii (2017). "Princes and Cossacks: Putting Ukraine on the Map of Europe" (PDF). In Flier, Michael S.; Kivelson, Valerie A.; Monahan, Erika; Rowland, Daniel (eds.). Seeing Muscovy Anew: Politics—Institutions—Culture. Essays in Honor of Nancy Shields Kollmann. Bloomington, IN: Slavica Publishers. ISBN 978-0-89357-481-9.
- Ragauskienė, Raimonda (22 February 2022) [2018]. "Radvilos Našlaitėlio žemėlapis". Visuotinė lietuvių enciklopedija (in Lithuanian). Mokslo ir enciklopedijų leidybos centras.
- Ulčinaitė, Eugenija (2002). "Žemėlapių tekstai ir jų vertimai". In Biliūnienė, Aldona; Kulnytė, Birutė; Subatniekienė, Rūta (eds.). Lietuva žemėlapiuose (in Lithuanian). Lietuvos nacionalinis muziejus. ISBN 9955-415-22-3.
