= Dissosteira longipennis =

High Plains Locust

Conservation status
- Secure (NatureServe)

Scientific classification
- Kingdom: Animalia
- Phylum: Arthropoda
- Clade: Pancrustacea
- Class: Insecta
- Order: Orthoptera
- Suborder: Caelifera
- Family: Acrididae
- Tribe: Trimerotropini
- Genus: Dissosteira
- Species: D. longipennis

Binomial name
- Dissosteira longipennis (Thomas, 1872)

Species of grasshopper

Dissosteira longipennis, the high plains locust, is a species of band-winged grasshopper in the family Acrididae. It is found in North America, specifically on the High Plains, consistently from eastern Wyoming and western Nebraska to eastern New Mexico and northwest Texas, and sometimes as far south as South Texas, north to Montana, and east to Iowa; it is now most common in Colorado and Kansas. During the 1930s, it formed enormous swarms and caused significant damage to crops in the western United States, but it is now very rare and has not swarmed since. However rare, the species is still extant, unlike the Rocky Mountain locust, the only other species of locust found in North America. (Excluding Central America)
