= Pacific Southwest District =

Pacific Southwest District is the name of:

- Pacific Southwest District (Church of the Brethren)
- Pacific Southwest District (Lutheran Church–Missouri Synod)
