= Dykra =

Dykra, Lithuanian for "wilderness", may refer to two areas:

- Wild Fields, Pontic Steppe wilderness in the territory of present-day Eastern and Southern Ukraine and Western Russia
- Große Wildnis "Great Wilderness", extremely sparsely inhabited area of wilderness in northern East Central Europe during the Middle Ages along the borders between Prussia, Livonia, and the Grand Duchy of Lithuania
