= Karashyn settlement hromada =

Karashyn rural hromada Карашинська сільська громада
- Former hromada
- Country: Ukraine
- Oblast: Cherkasy Oblast
- Raion: Korsun-Shevchenkivskyi Raion
- Formed: 8 June 2017
- Disbanded: 2020
- Seat: Karashyna

Karashyn rural hromada was a former hromada (amalgamated territorial community) in Ukraine, located in the Korsun-Shevchenkivskyi Raion of Cherkasy Oblast. Its administrative centre was the village of Karashyna.

== History ==
The hromada was established on 8 June 2017 through the merger of five village councils: Zavadivska, Kvitchanska, Koshmakivska, Petrushkivska, and Cherepynska councils of Korsun-Shevchenkivskyi Raion. The first local elections were held on 29 October 2017.

In 2020, the hromada was dissolved during Ukraine’s administrative reform, and its entire territory was incorporated into the Selyshche hromada.

== Composition ==
The hromada consisted of 10 villages:

List of villages in the hromada
Village	Population (2001 Census)
Vilkhovchyk	255
Hlushky	196
Zavadivka	698
Karashyna	616
Kvitky	982
Koshmak	221
Lystvyna	549
Myropillia	187
Petrushky	417
Cherepyn	464
