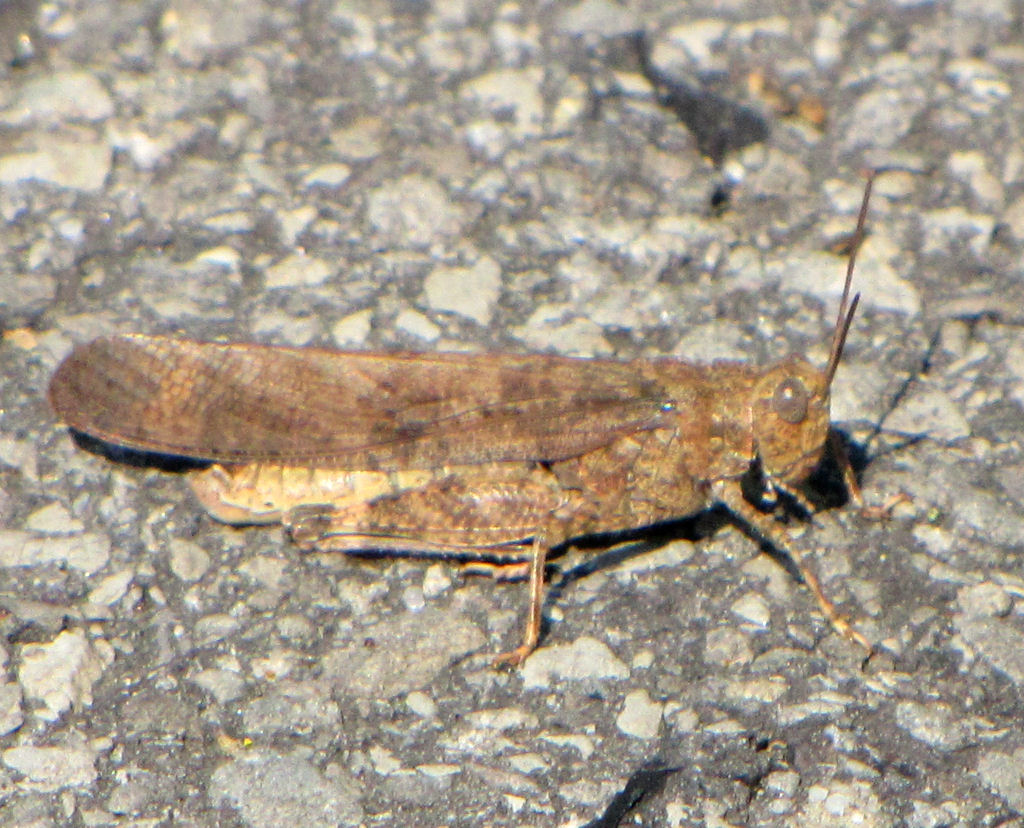
- Carolina Grasshopper (Dissosteira carolina)

Scientific classification
- Kingdom: Animalia
- Phylum: Arthropoda
- Clade: Pancrustacea
- Class: Insecta
- Order: Orthoptera
- Suborder: Caelifera
- Family: Acrididae
- Subfamily: Oedipodinae
- Tribe: Trimerotropini
- Genus: Dissosteira; Scudder, 1876

= Dissosteira =

Genus of grasshoppers

Dissosteira is a genus of grasshoppers in the family Acrididae found in North America. They are about 1 to 1 1/2 inches long, and range from gray to various shades of brown.

== Species ==
Arranged alphabetically.

- Dissosteira carolina (Linnaeus, 1758) – Carolina Grasshopper, Black-winged Grasshopper (also called Road-duster)
- Dissosteira longipennis (Thomas, 1872) – High Plains Grasshopper
- Dissosteira pictipennis Bruner, 1905 – California Rose-Winged Grasshopper
- Dissosteira spurcata Saussure, 1884 – Spurcate Grasshopper
