= Korsun-Shevchenkivskyi =

City in central Ukraine

Korsun-Shevchenkivskyi Корсунь-Шевченківський
- City
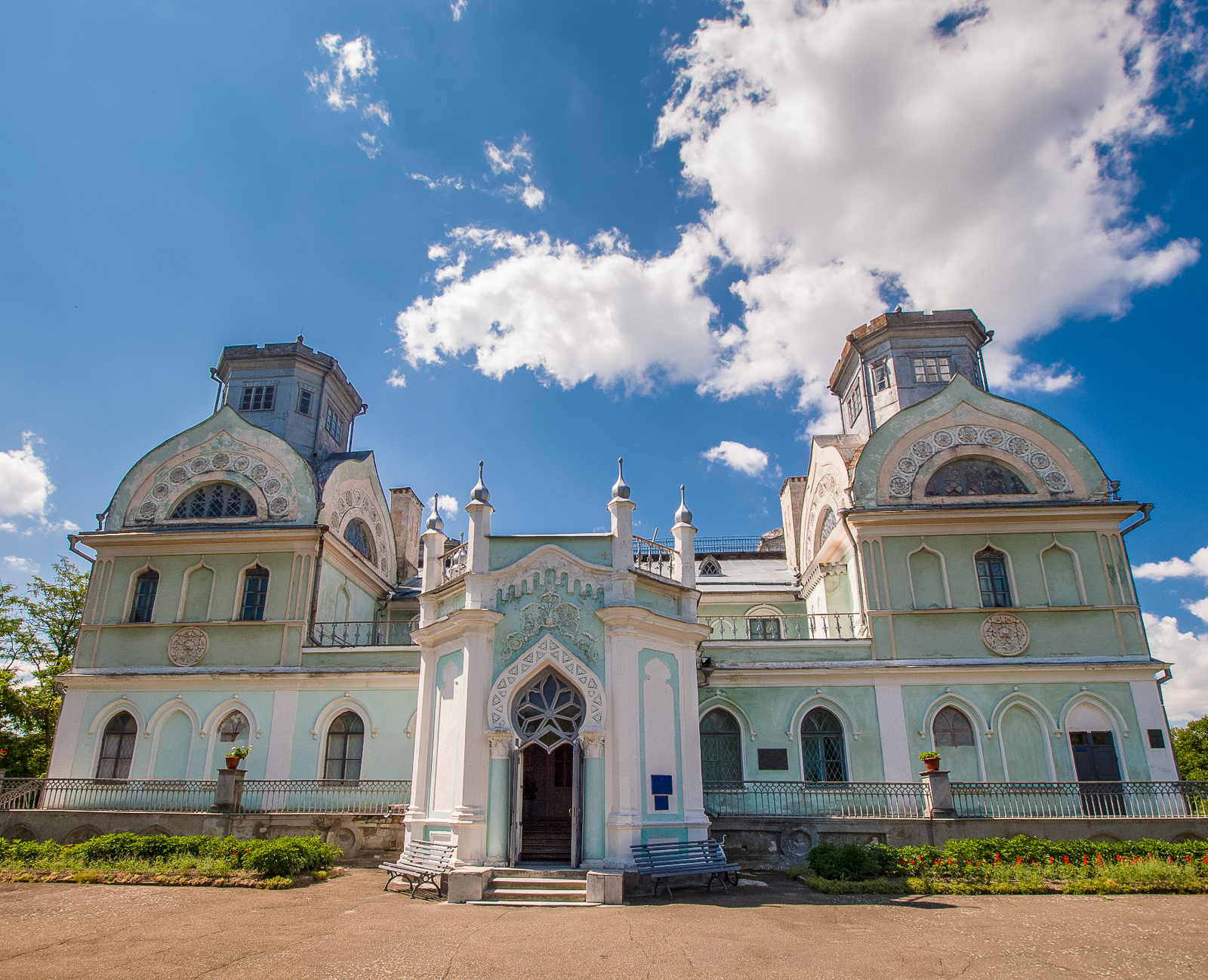
- The palace of the Lopukhin-Demydov family

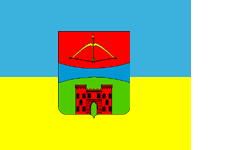
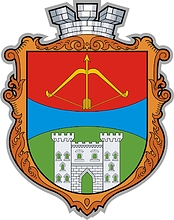
- Flag Coat of arms

- Location of Korsun-Shevchenkivskyi Korsun-Shevchenkivskyi (Ukraine)
- Coordinates: 49.41591°N 31.25617°E
- Country: Ukraine
- Oblast: Cherkasy Oblast
- Raion: Cherkasy Raion
- Hromada: Korsun-Shevchenkivskyi urban hromada
- First mentioned: 1032

Area
  - Total: 118.65 km^{2} (45.81 sq mi)
- Elevation: 94 m (308 ft)

Population (2022)
  - Total: 17,216
  - Density: 163/km^{2} (420/sq mi)
- Postal code: 19400
- Area code: +380 4735
- Sister cities: Gifhorn

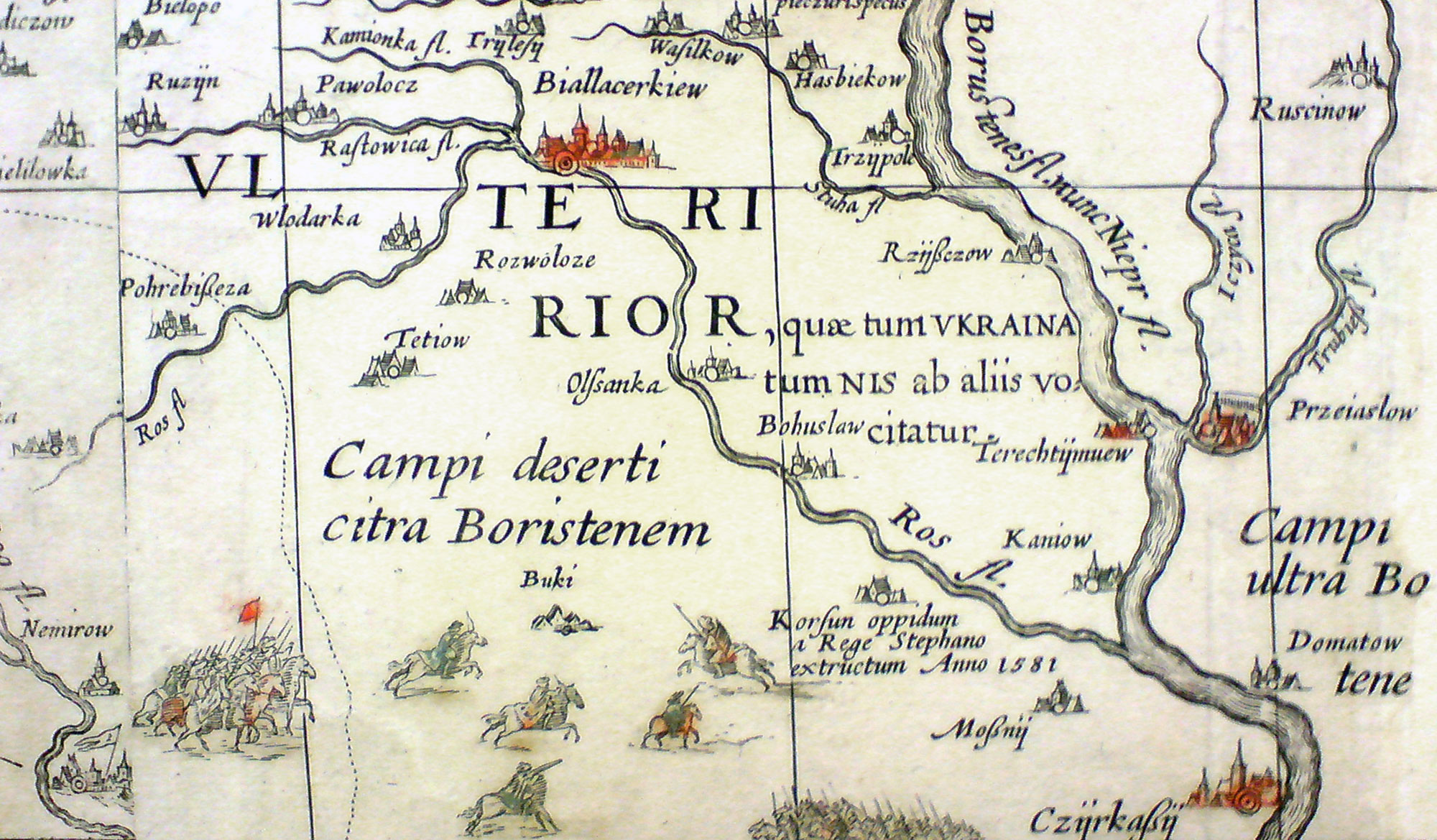
Korsun on the Radziwiłł map (1613)

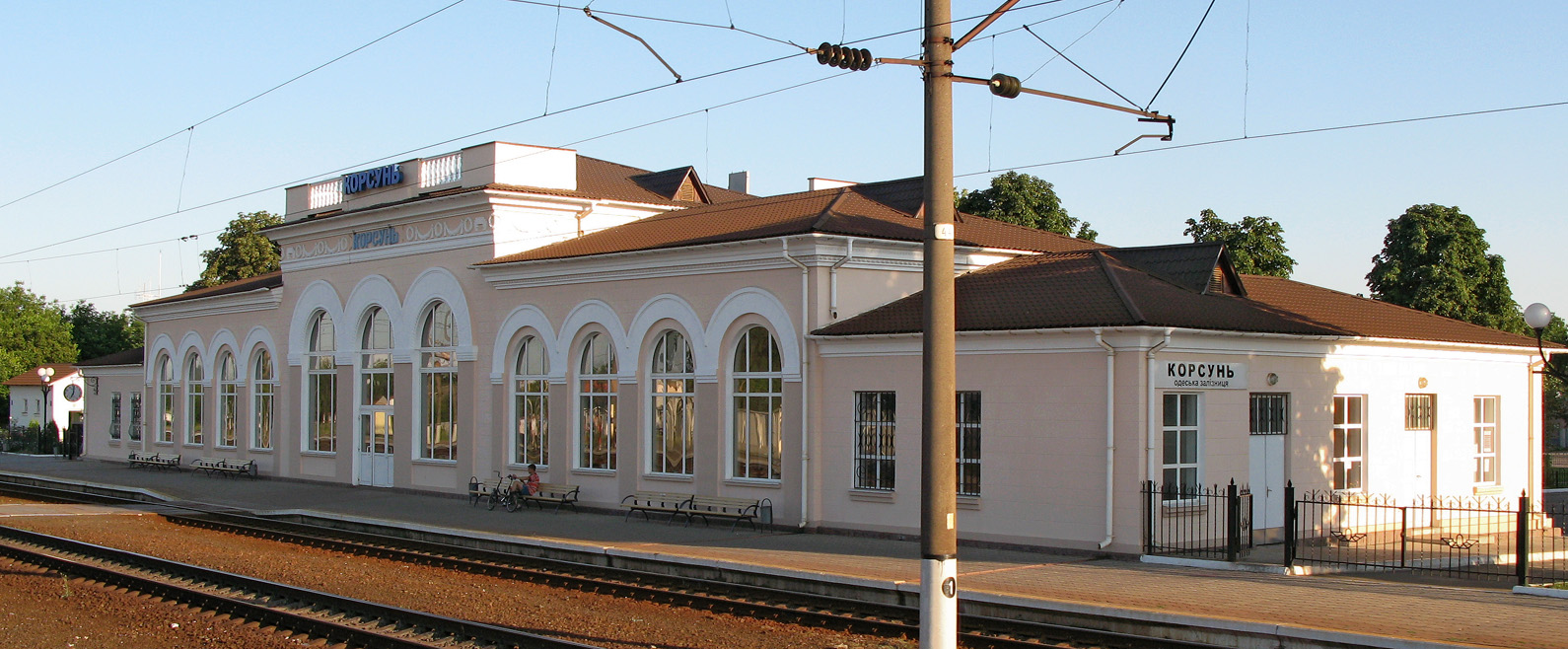
Railway station

Korsun-Shevchenkivskyi (Ukrainian: Корсунь-Шевченківський [ˈkɔrsʊnʲ ʃeu̯ˈtʃɛnkiu̯sʲkɪi̯]), Korsun until 1944, is a city in Cherkasy Raion, Cherkasy Oblast, central Ukraine. It hosts the administration of Korsun-Shevchenkivskyi urban hromada. The city lies on the banks of the Ros River. Population: 17,216 (2022 estimate).

== History ==
=== Medieval period ===
A fortress at Korsun was founded in 1032 by the Kievan Rus' prince Yaroslav the Wise. It protected Kyiv from nomads from the southern steppe regions. The name of the city comes from the Greek city of Chersonesus (translated as Korsun) on the Crimean Peninsula. The town is first recorded in a manuscript from 1169.

From 1195, Korsun was the main fortress of the appanage ruled by the descendants of Vladimir II Monomakh. In 1240, the fortress was destroyed by the Mongols. In 1320 the area was absorbed into the Grand Duchy of Lithuania. Following the Union of Lublin (1569) it belonged to the Polish–Lithuanian Commonwealth. In 1585 a Polish fortress was built there, the town received the Magdeburg rights, and it became the main town of the Korsun starostvo.

=== Early modern era ===
In 1630, Cossack rebels, led by Taras Fedorovych, attacked the town and destroyed the Polish garrison. The town was razed by Polish forces during the 1637 Cossack rebellion that was led by Pavlo Pavliuk. During the Khmelnytsky Uprising, the Battle of Korsuń (1648) was fought near the town. In 1768, during the Koliyivschyna Rebellion, the Polish garrison was destroyed by the forces of the Ukrainian Cossack Maksym Zalizniak. In 1793, Korsun was included into the Russian Empire.

=== Modern period ===
In 1903, one of the largest paint factories in the empire was located in Korsun. In the Second World War, the Soviet Red Army defeated the German forces in the area surrounding Korsun that is now referred to as the Korsun Pocket. On 14 February 1944, Korsun was cleared of German forces.

Following the end of the war, the agricultural economy of Korsun was rebuilt. In 1944, the city was renamed in honour of Taras Shevchenko, a famous Ukrainian poet and artist.

In 2014, Korsun became the centre of a Russian media campaign, which accused Euromaidan supporters of attacking a bus convoy of anti-Maidan activists on the night of 20–21 February 2014 in Korsun-Shevchenkivskyi. They were accused of burning buses, and killing seven passengers. On 3 April 2014, Russian forces occupying Crimea stated that seven people had died and 30 gone missing. Amnesty International, Human Rights Watch, and the local police force refuted the accuracy of this account. Russian president Putin used the 'incident' to justify the military operation in Crimea.

Until 18 July 2020, Korsun-Shevchenkivskyi served as an administrative centre of Korsun-Shevchenkivskyi Raion. The raion was abolished in July 2020 when the number of raions of Cherkasy Oblast was reduced to four.

== Economy ==
Korsun station is located on the Kyiv–Tsvitkove line. Korsun-Shevchenkivskyi also has a number of factories, producing machinery, construction materials, asphalt, wine, and textiles.

== Architecture ==
The city has a park that was part of the former palace of the Lopukhin family. It is considered to be one of the finest Romantic-style palaces in Ukraine. It was built in 1782 by Stanisław Poniatowski, the King of Poland and Grand Duke of Lithuania, a writer and artist. In the middle of the 19th century, the park was enhanced with many sculptures, and small pedestrian bridges were added.

The city also has several museums, including the Poniatovsky Palace Museum, a historical museum, and a military museum.

== Famous people ==
- Vasyl Avramenko, actor, dancer, choreographer, ballet master, director, and film producer
- Anatoli Khorozov, president of the Ice Hockey Federation of Ukraine, hotel businessman
- Kyrylo Stetsenko, composer, conductor, critic, and teacher

== Twinned towns ==
Korsun-Shevchenkivskyi is twinned with:

- Chojnice, Poland
- Gifhorn, Germany

=== Gallery ===
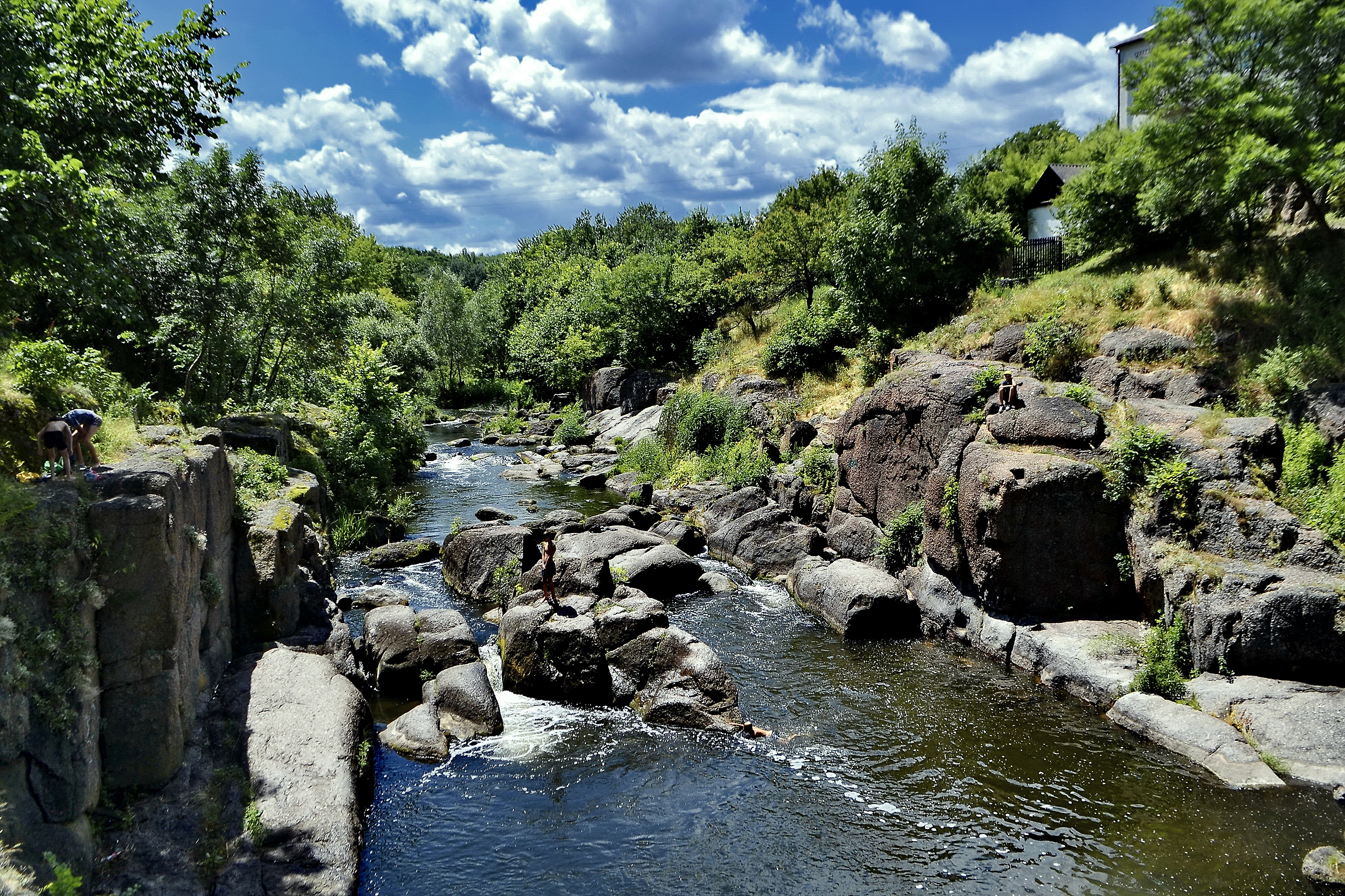
A branch of the Ros River near the palace of the Lopukhin-Demydov family

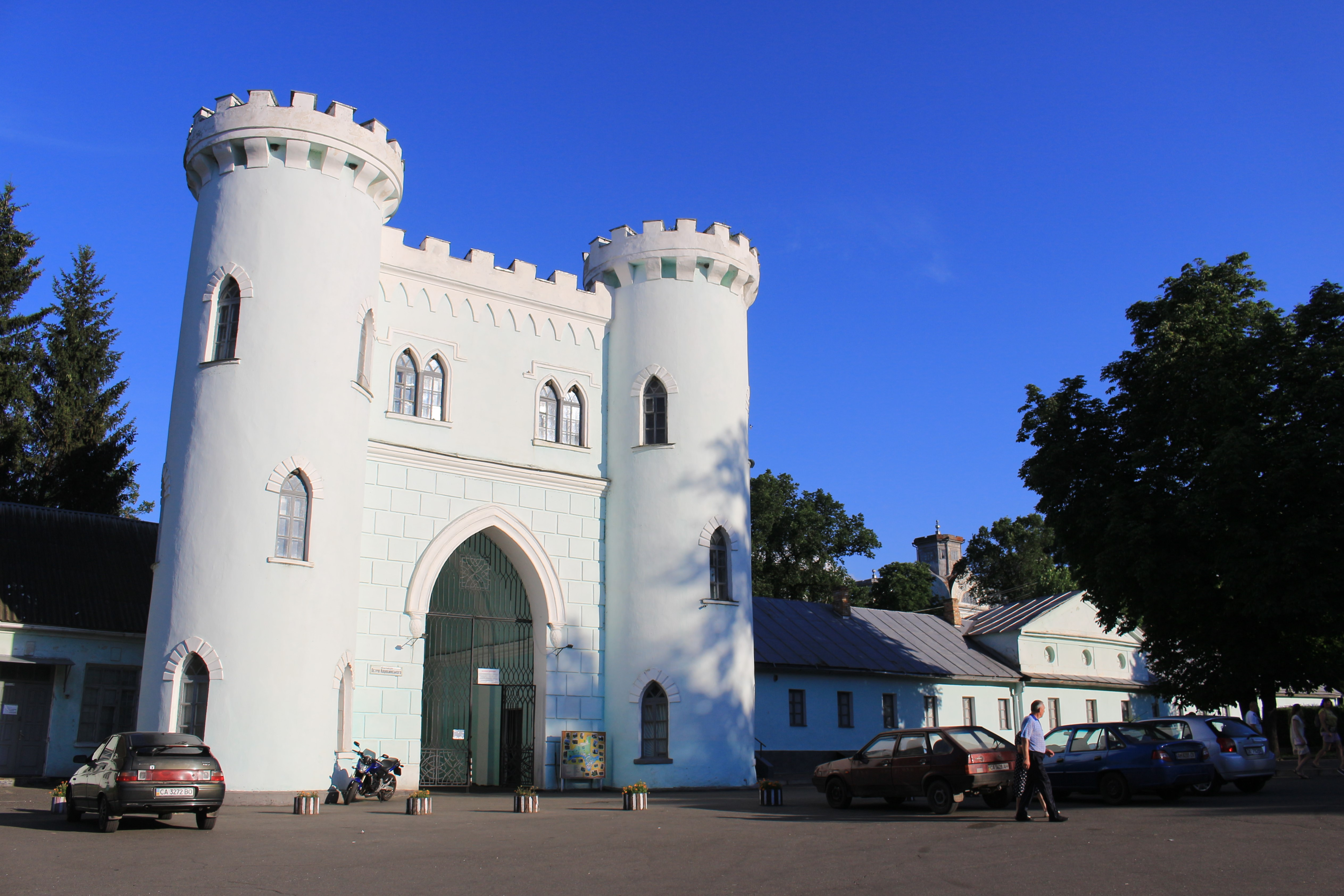
Entrance to the premises of the palace

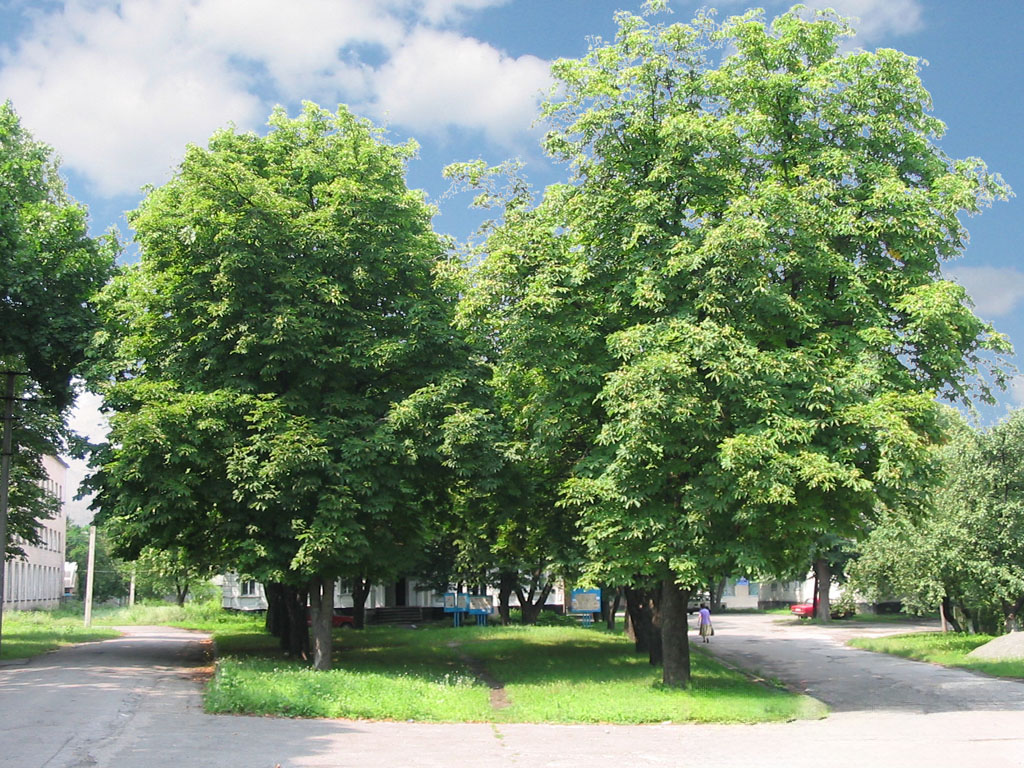
Korsun-Shevchenkivskyi city center

Site of the medieval fortress

== See also ==
- Korsun Pocket – 1944 battle on the Eastern Front of World War II.
- Battle of Korsun – 1648 battle during the Khmelnytsky Uprising.

== Sources ==
- (1972) Історіа міст і сіл Української CCP - Черкаська область (History of Towns and Villages of the Ukrainian SSR - Cherkasy Oblast), Kyiv. (in Ukrainian)
