= Wild Fields =

Historical term for the Pontic Steppe

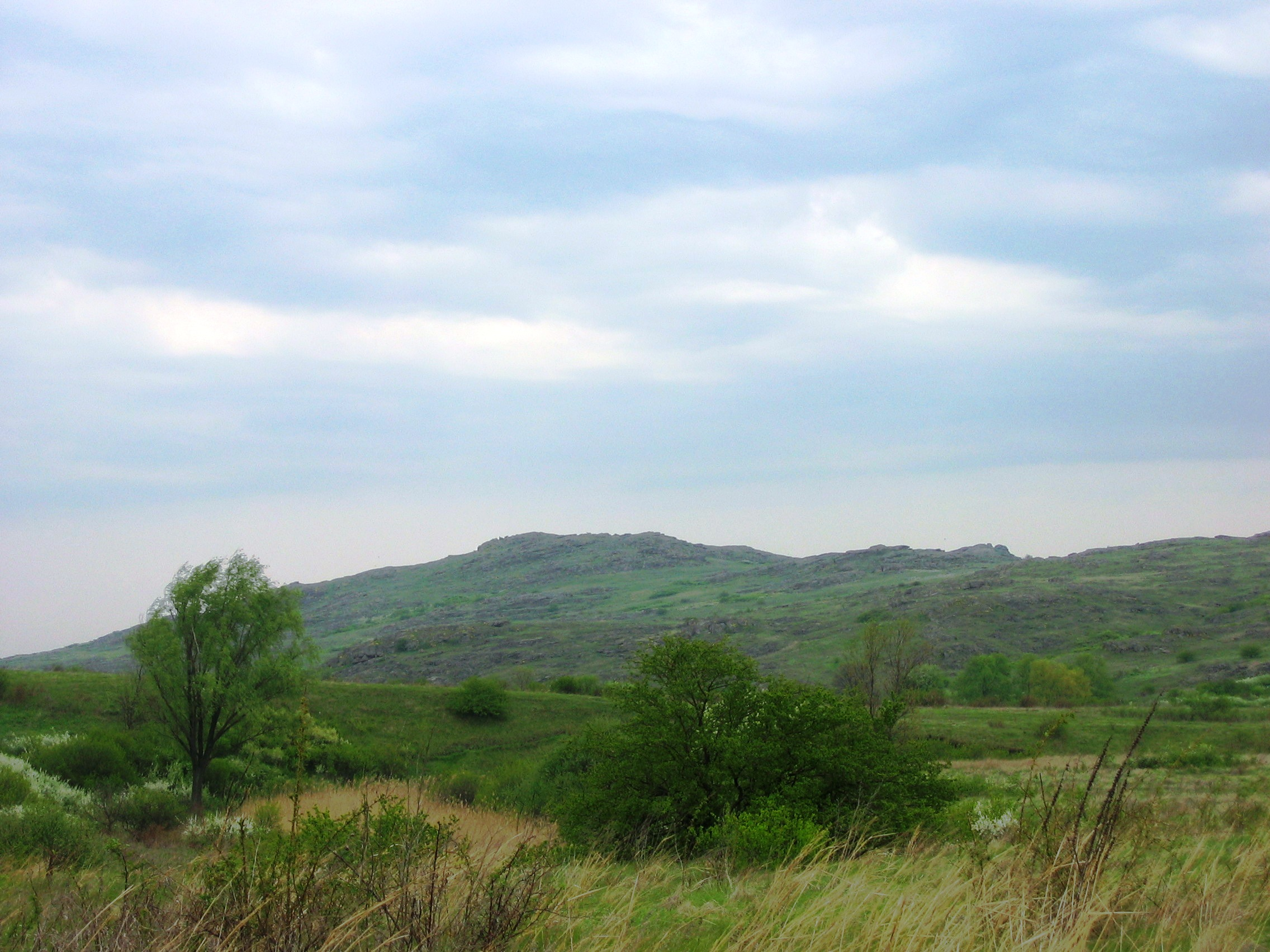
Kamyana Mohyla in Ukraine

The Wild Fields (Note: Ukrainian: Дике Поле, romanized: Dyke Pole, Russian: Дикое Поле, romanized: Dikoye Polye, Polish: Dzikie pola, Lithuanian: Dykra, Latin: Loca deserta or campi deserti inhabitati, also translated as "the wilderness") is a historical term used in the Polish–Lithuanian documents of the 16th to 18th centuries to refer to the Pontic steppe in the territory of present-day Eastern and Southern Ukraine and Southern Russia, north of the Black Sea and Azov Sea. It was the traditional name for the Black Sea steppes in the 16th and 17th centuries. In a narrow sense, it is the historical name for the demarcated and sparsely populated Black Sea steppes between the middle and lower reaches of the Dniester in the west, the lower reaches of the Don and the Donets in the east, from the left tributary of the Dnipro–Samara, and the upper reaches of the Southern Bug–Syniukha and Inhul in the north, to the Black and Azov Seas and Crimea in the south.

In a broad sense, it is the name of the entire Great Eurasian Steppe, which was also called Great Scythia in ancient times or Great Tartary in the Middle Ages in European sources and Dasht-i Qipchaq in Eastern (mainly Persian) sources.

According to Ukrainian historian Vitaliy Shcherbak, the term appeared sometime in the 15th century for the territory between the Dniester and the mid-Volga, when Zaporozhian Cossacks began colonising the region. Shcherbak notes that the term's contemporaries, such as Michalo Lituanus, Blaise de Vigenère, and Józef Wereszczyński, wrote about the great natural riches of the steppes and the Dnieper basin.

== History ==
The Pontic steppes, c. 1015

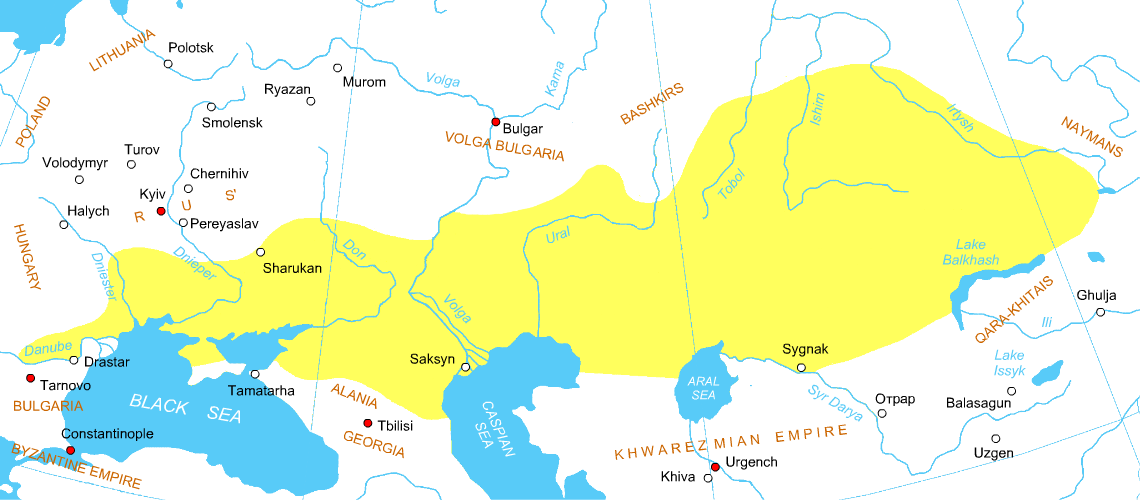
Cuman–Kipchak confederation in Eurasia c. 1200

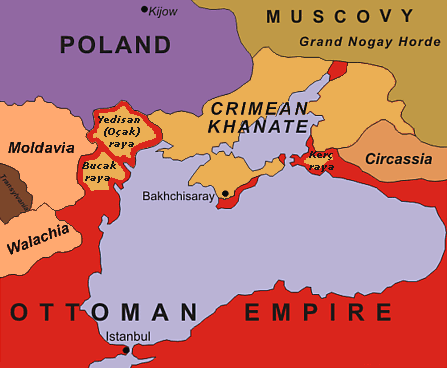
The Crimean Khanate circa 1600. Note that the areas marked Poland and Muscovy were claimed rather than administered and were thinly populated.

From the Neolithic and intermittently until the mid-2nd millennium AD, the area served as a borderland and area of intense struggle between agriculture-practising settled peoples to the west and the nomads of the Eurasian Steppe. Nomadism prevailed in the Wild Fields since antiquity, and settled life (civilisation) was established with great difficulty. For centuries, the region was sparsely populated by various nomadic groups such as Scythians, Sarmatians, Alans, Huns, Cumans, Khazars, Bulgars, Pechenegs, Kipchaks, Turco-Mongols, Tatars and Nogais. There were Pontic Greek colonies on the Pontic steppes of the Wild Fields — Tanais, Olbia, Borysthenes, Nikonion, Tyras.

The rule of Great Khazaria on these lands was won by Kievan Rus, then Kievan Rus was replaced by the Mongol Empire. The steppes of the Wild Fields were suitable for the development of agriculture, animal husbandry, horse breeding and crafts, which led to their colonisation as early as the Kievan state. These attempts to settle the land were hindered by aggressive raids from steppe nomads that swept across the region in waves. After the Mongol invasion of Kievan Rus', the territory was ruled by the Golden Horde until the Battle of Blue Waters (1362), which allowed Algirdas to claim it for the Grand Duchy of Lithuania. After the Battle of the Vorskla River in 1399, the successor Vytautas lost the territory to Temür Qutlugh, the khan of the Golden Horde.

After the Tatar-Mongols pillaged and devastated the agriculturally based villages and people on these lands, the Black Sea steppes became more officially known as the Wild Fields (wilderness) on boundary maps and for governance. In 1441, the western section of the Wild Fields, Yedisan, came under the Crimean Khanate, a political entity controlled by the expanding Ottoman Empire from the 16th century onward. The 14th and 15th centuries were particularly favourable for Ukrainians to settle the Wild Fields, when these lands became part of the Grand Duchy of Lithuania. Thus, the Wild Fields were partly inhabited by the Zaporizhian Cossacks, as reflected in works of the Polish theologian and Catholic bishop of Kiev Józef Wereszczyński, who settled there in the 15th century under the condition that he would fight off expansion by the Nogai Horde and the growing danger from attacks by the Crimean Khanate. And in 1552 the first Ukrainian proto-state Zaporozhian Sich was established.

The Wild Fields region was traversed by the horse nomads using the Muravsky Trail and Izium Trail, important warpaths used by the Crimean Tatars to invade and pillage the Grand Principality of Moscow. The Crimean-Nogai Raids, a long period of raids and fighting between the Crimean Tatars and Nogai Horde on one side and the Lithuania and Muscovy on the other side, caused considerable devastation and depopulation in the area before the rise of the Zaporozhian Cossacks, who periodically sailed down the Dnieper in dugouts from their base at Khortytsia and raided the coast of the Black Sea. The Turks built several fortress towns to defend the littoral, including Kara Kerman and Khadjibey.

What made the "wild field" so forbidding were the Tatars. Year after year, their swift raiding parties swept down on the towns and villages to pillage, kill the old and frail, and drive away thousands of captives to be sold as slaves in the Crimean port of Kaffa, a city often referred to by Russians as "the vampire that drinks the blood of Rus" ... For example, from 1450 to 1586, eighty-six raids were recorded, and from 1600 to 1647, seventy. Although estimates of the number of captives taken in a single raid reached as high as 30,000, the average figure was closer to 3000 .... In Podilia alone, about one-third of all the villages were devastated or abandoned between 1578 and 1583.

— Orest Subtelny

In the 16th and 17th centuries, the government of the Polish–Lithuanian Commonwealth considered the Ukrainian lands to the east and south of Bila Tserkva to be the Wild Fields, and distributed them to magnates and nobility as uninhabited private property, despite the Ukrainians living there.

By the 17th century, the east part of the Wild Fields had been settled by runaway peasants and serfs, who made up the core of the Cossackdom. During the Khmelnytsky Uprising (from 1648 to 1657) the north part of this area was settled by Cossacks from the Dnieper basin and came to be known as Sloboda Ukraine. After a successful uprising led by Bohdan Khmelnytsky, in which he allied with Crimean Tatars, a new state, the Cossack Hetmanate, was established on the territory of the Wild Fields. Hetman Khmelnytsky made a triumphant entry into Kiev on Christmas 1648, where he was hailed as a people's liberator from Polish captivity. As ruler of the Hetmanate, Khmelnytsky engaged in state-building across multiple spheres: military, administration, finance, economics, and culture. He invested the Zaporozhian Host under its Hetman with supreme power in the new Ruthenian state, and he unified all spheres of Ukrainian society under his authority. This involved building a government system and a developed military and civilian administration from Cossack officers and Ruthenian nobles, as well as establishing an elite within the Cossack Hetmanate. After the Crimean Tatars betrayed the Cossacks for the third time in 1653, Khmelnytsky realised he could no longer rely on Ottoman support against Poland, and he was forced to turn to Tsardom of Russia for help. Final attempts to negotiate took place in January 1654 in the town of Pereiaslav between Khmelnytsky, Cossack leaders, and the Tsar's ambassador, Vasiliy Buturlin, in which the Pereiaslav agreement was signed. As a result of the treaty, the Zaporozhian Host became an autonomous Hetmanate within the Tsardom of Russia.

The period of Hetmanate history known as "The Ruin", lasting from 1657 to 1687, was marked by constant civil wars throughout the state. The newly reinstalled Yurii Khmelnytsky signed the newly composed Pereiaslav Articles of 1659 that were increasingly unfavourable for the Hetmanate and later led to the introduction of serfdom rights. In 1667, the Thirteen Years' War ended with the Truce of Andrusovo, which split the Cossack Hetmanate along the Dnieper River: Left-bank Ukraine enjoyed a degree of autonomy within the Tsardom of Russia, while Right-bank Ukraine remained part of the Polish–Lithuanian Commonwealth and was temporarily occupied by the Ottoman Empire in the period of 1672–1699. After the defeat of the Ottomans at the Battle of Vienna in 1683, Poland managed to recover Right-bank Ukraine by 1690, except for the city of Kiev, and reincorporated it into their respective voivodeships of the Polish–Lithuanian Commonwealth, while the Hetmanate administration was abolished between 1699 and 1704.

The period of the Ruin effectively ended when Ivan Mazepa was elected hetman and served from 1687 to 1708. He brought stability to the Hetmanate, which was again united under a single hetman. During his reign, the Great Northern War broke out between Russia and Sweden. Mazepa and some Zaporozhian Cossacks allied themselves with the Swedes on October 28, 1708. Russia won the decisive battle of Poltava (in 1709), ending Mazepa's goal of independence promised in an earlier treaty with Sweden. The Liquidation of the autonomy of the Cossack Hetmanate has begun.

During the reign of Catherine II of Russia, the Cossack Hetmanate's autonomy was progressively destroyed. After several earlier attempts, the Russian government finally abolished the office of hetman in 1764, and the Little Russian Collegium assumed its functions, fully incorporating the Hetmanate into the Russian Empire. On May 7, 1775, Empress Catherine II issued a direct order to destroy the Zaporozhian Sich. On June 5, 1775, Russian artillery and infantry surrounded the Sich and razed it to the ground. Russian troops disarmed the Cossacks and confiscated the treasury archives. This marked the end of the Zaporozhian Cossacks. According to the 1756 Zaporozhian Host Register only 30,000 people resided here; due to frequent Crimean Tatar raids.

After a series of Russo-Turkish wars waged by Catherine II, the area formerly controlled by the Ottomans and the Crimean Tatars was incorporated into the Russian Empire in the 1780s, during which nomadic life in these territories ceased to exist in its ancient form. The Russian Empire began active colonisation and built many cities in the Wild Fields, including Odessa, Yekaterinoslav, and Nikolaev. The definition of Wild Fields does not include the Crimean Peninsula. The area was filled with Russian and Ukrainian settlers, and the name "Wild Fields" became outdated; it was instead referred to as New Russia (Novorossiya). At the end of the 18th century, the name "Wild Fields" ceased to be used. According to the Historical Dictionary of Ukraine,

"The population consisted of military colonists from hussar and lancer regiments, Ukrainian and Russian peasants, Cossacks, Serbs, Montenegrins, Hungarians, and other foreigners who received land subsidies for settling in the area."

In the 20th century, after the collapse of the USSR, the region was divided among Ukraine, Moldova, and Russia.

In 1917, the world's first anarchist state was formed on the territory of Wild Fields — Makhnovia.

The territory of Wild Fields is located in the modern Dnipro, Donetsk, Zaporizhzhia, Kirovohrad, Luhansk, Mykolaiv, Odesa, Poltava, Kharkiv and Kherson oblasts of Ukraine.

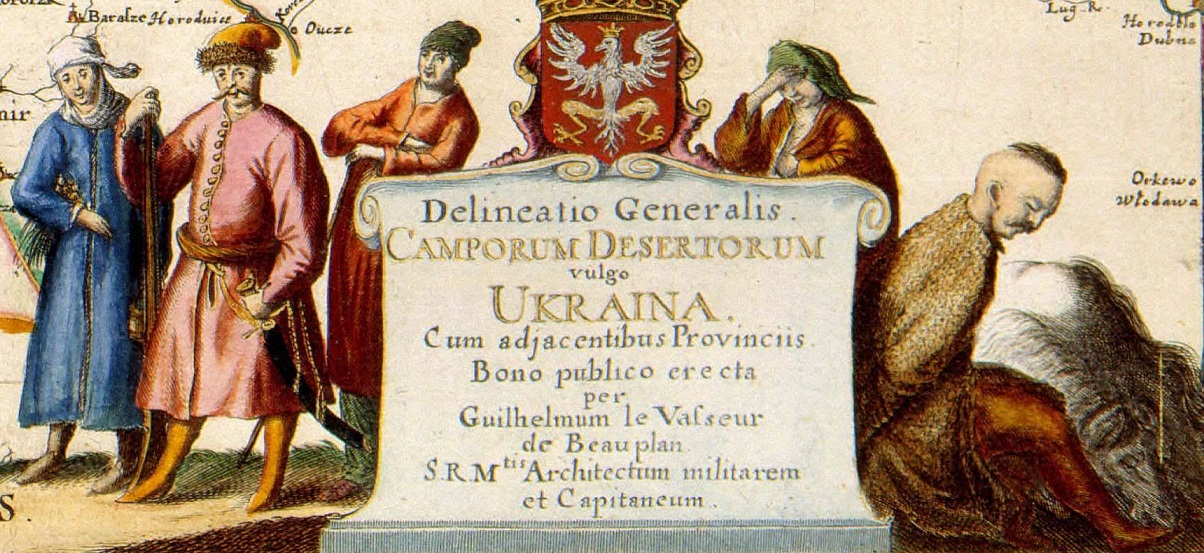
Delineatio Generalis Camporum Desertorum vulgo Ukraina (General sketch of devastated fields commonly known as Ukraina)

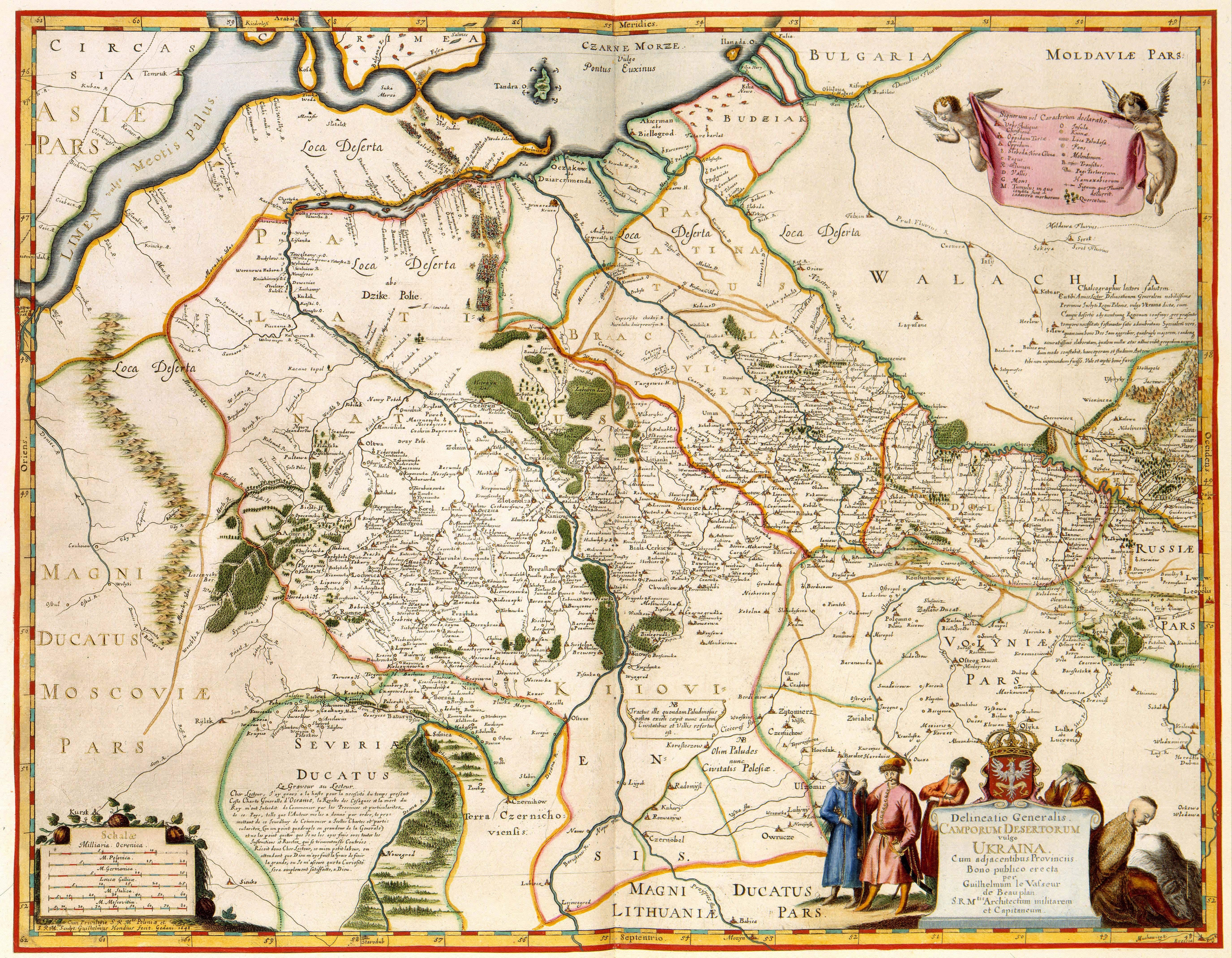
The Wild Fields on a map by French-Polish cartographer Guillaume Le Vasseur de Beauplan, 1648 (south-north orientation)

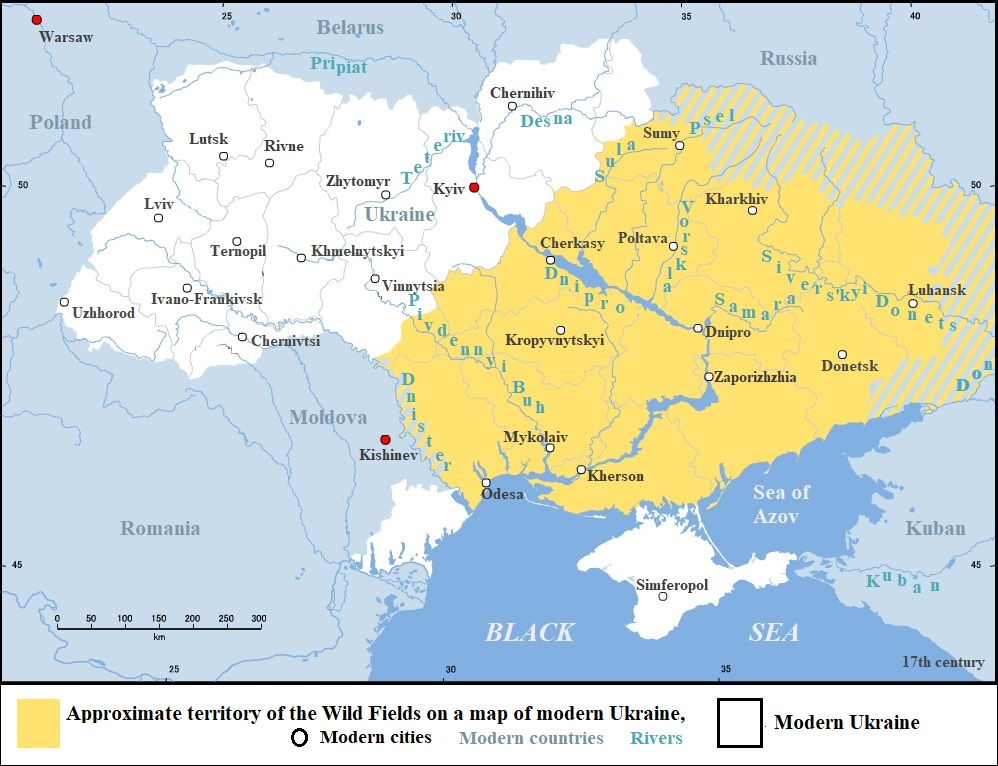
Map of the Wild Fields in the 17th century

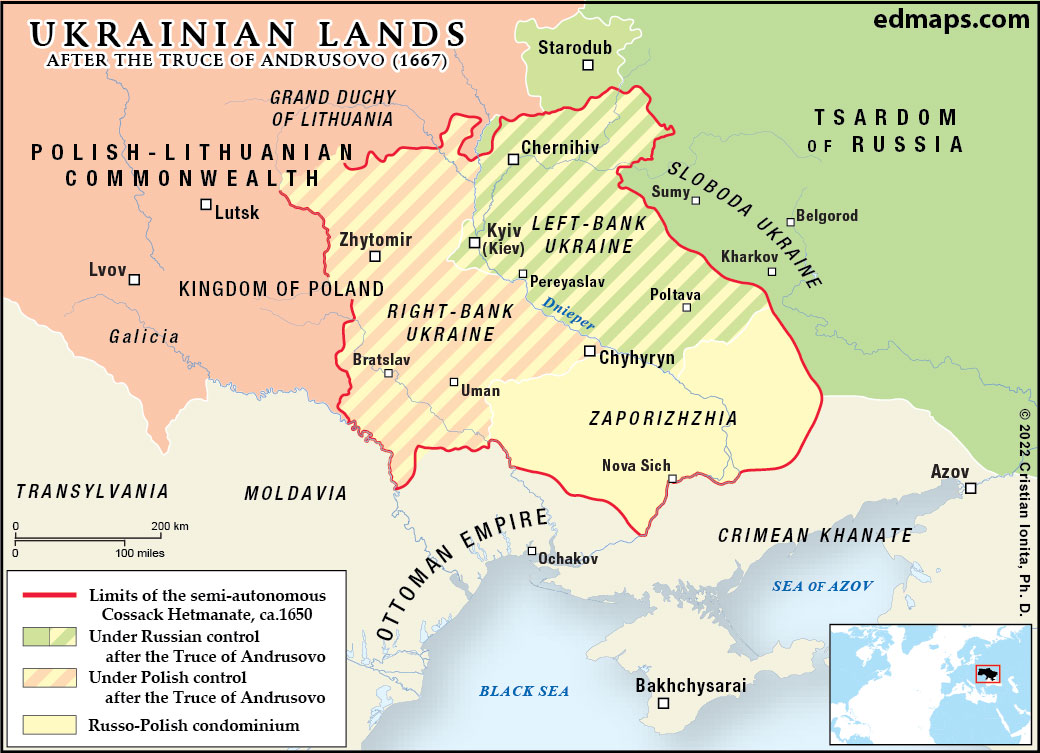
Partition of Cossack Hetmanate after the Truce of Andrusovo (1667)

General type of the Ukraine or Palatinate of Podolia, showing the lands of Kiev and Braslav with new delineations, 1681

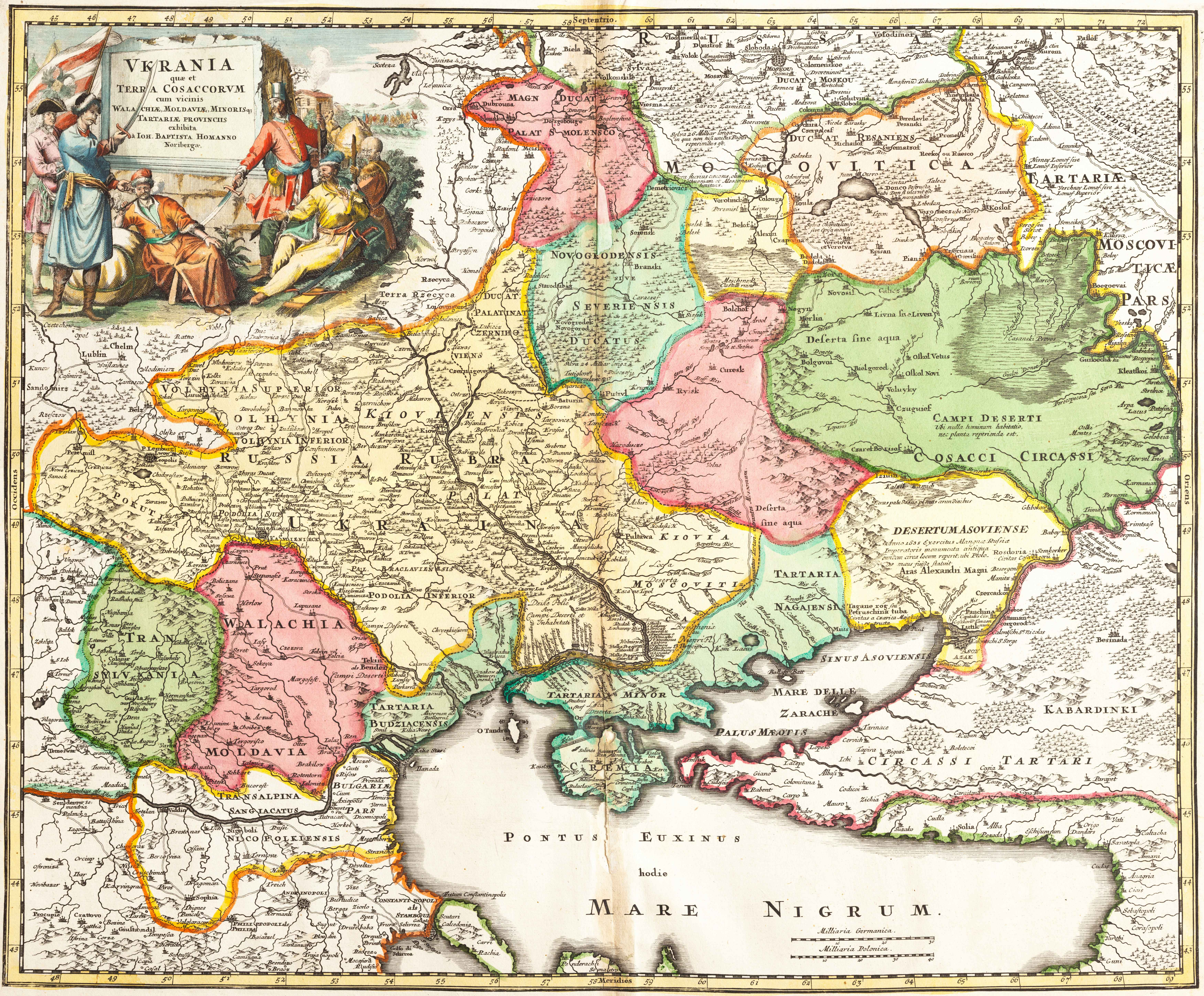
The Wild Fields (Dzike Polie) on a 1720 map by Johann Baptist Homann.

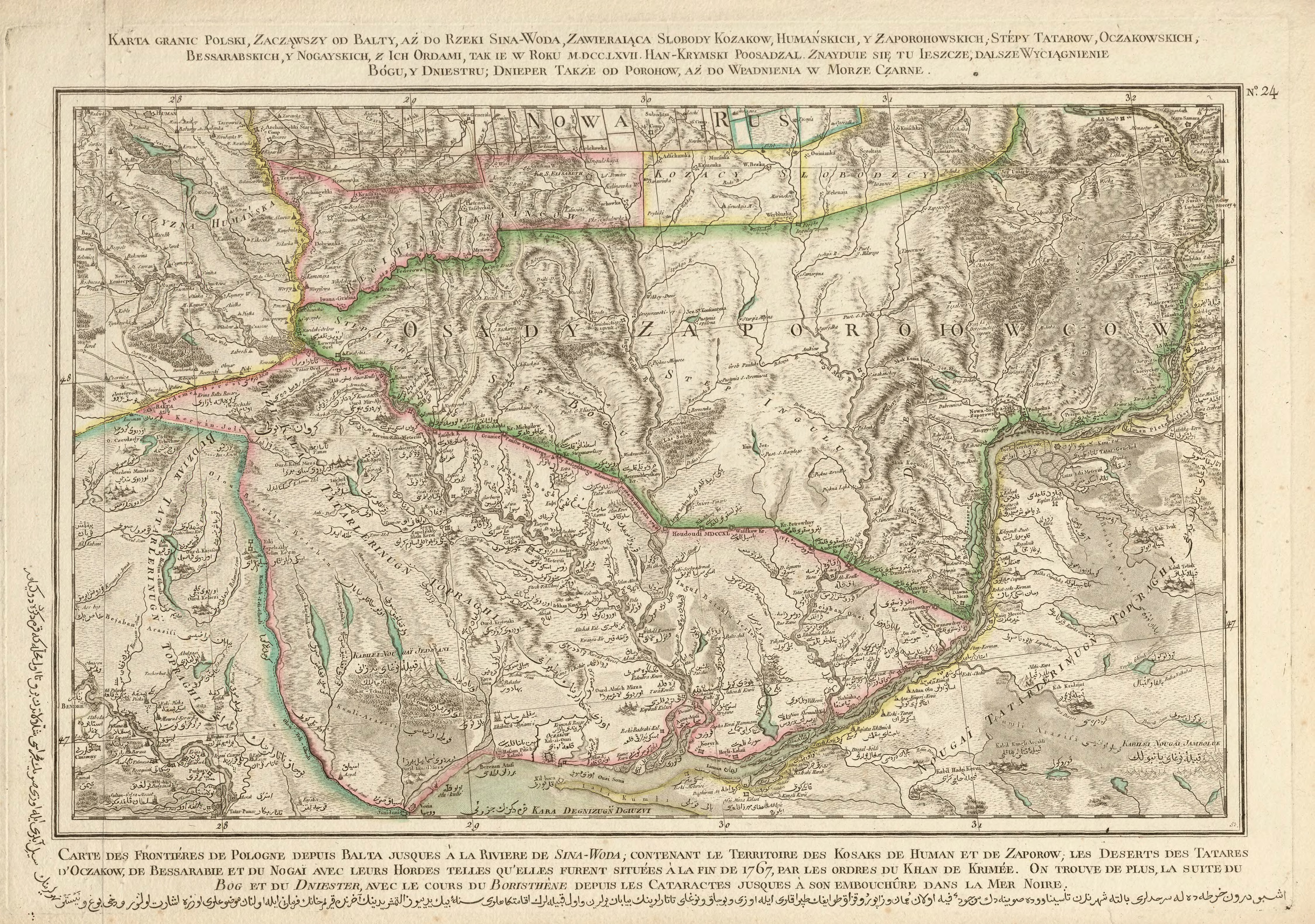
Map by cartographer Giovanni Antonio Rizzi-Zannoni, 1772

== See also ==
- European Plain
- High Plains
- Makhnovshchina
- New Serbia (historical province)
- Novorossiya
- Southern Ukraine
- Zaporozhian Sich
- Great Wilderness
