= Western Plains =

Western Plains may refer to:

== In Australia ==
- Far West (New South Wales)
- Taronga Western Plains Zoo, formerly just Western Plains Zoo, near Dubbo, New South Wales
- Western Plains (New South Wales), an area west of the Great Dividing Range in New South Wales, Australia, centred on Dubbo
- Western Plains Regional Council, former name for Dubbo Regional Council
- Western Plains wine zone, Geographical Indication which extends from vineyards near Dubbo across to the South Australia and Queensland borders

== In North America ==
- Great Plains, also known as Western Plains, a broad expanse of flatland west of the Mississippi River and east of the Rocky Mountains in the United States and Canada
- Western Plains District of the boy scouts in Oklahoma, United States
- Western Plains District (Church of the Brethren), a district of the Church of the Brethren in the United States
- Western Plains USD 106, a public unified school district in Ransom, Kansas, United States
