= Korsun-Shevchenkivskyi Raion =

Former subdivision of Cherkasy Oblast, Ukraine

Korsun-Shevchenkivskyi Raion Корсунь-Шевченківський район
- Raion
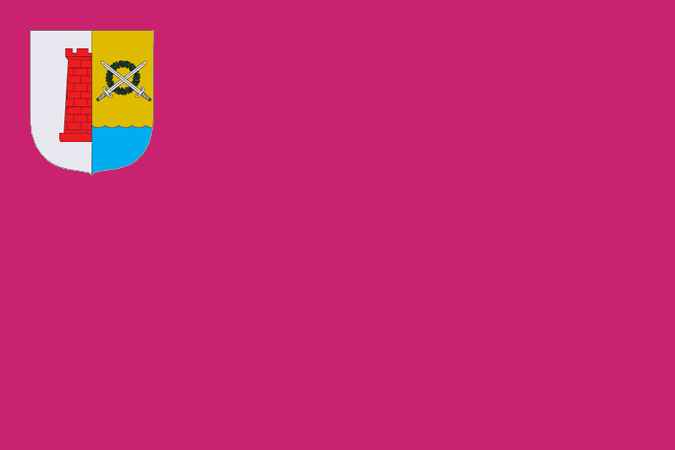
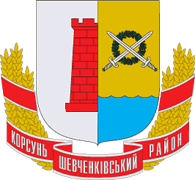
- Flag Coat of arms

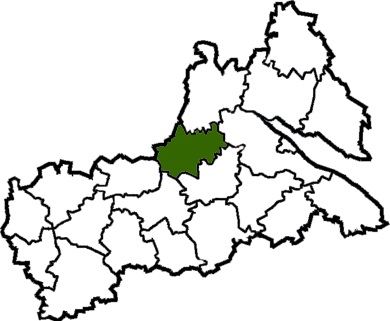
- Coordinates: 49°24′56″N 31°13′49″E
- Country: Ukraine
- Region: Cherkasy Oblast
- Established: 1923
- Disestablished: 18 July 2020
- Subdivisions: List: — city councils; — settlement councils; — rural councils; Number of localities: — cities; — urban-type settlements; — villages; — rural settlements

Area
  - Total: 896 km^{2} (346 sq mi)

Population (2020)
  - Total: 40,625
  - Density: 45.3/km^{2} (117/sq mi)
- Time zone: UTC+02:00 (EET)
  - Summer (DST): UTC+03:00 (EEST)
- Area code: 380

Korsun-Shevchenkivskyi Raion (Ukrainian: Корсунь-Шевченківський район) was a raion (district) of Cherkasy Oblast, central Ukraine. Its administrative centre was located at the town of Korsun-Shevchenkivskyi. The raion covered an area of 896 square kilometres. The raion was abolished on 18 July 2020 as part of the administrative reform of Ukraine, which reduced the number of raions of Cherkasy Oblast to four. The area of Korsun-Shevchenkivskyi Raion was split between Cherkasy Raion and Zvenyhorodka Raion. The last estimate of the raion population was 40,625 (2020 est.)

At the time of disestablishment, the raion consisted of four hromadas:

- Korsun-Shevchenkivskyi urban hromada with the administration in Korsun-Shevchenkivskyi, transferred to Cherkasy Raion;
- Nabutiv rural hromada with the administration in the selo of Nabutiv, transferred to Cherkasy Raion;
- Selishche rural hromada with the administration in the selo of Selishche, transferred to Zvenyhorodka Raion;
- Stebliv settlement hromada with the administration in the urban-type settlement of Stebliv, transferred to Zvenyhorodka Raion.
