= Dissosteira carolina =

- on Vancouver Island, BC

Conservation status
- Secure (NatureServe)

Scientific classification
- Kingdom: Animalia
- Phylum: Arthropoda
- Clade: Pancrustacea
- Class: Insecta
- Order: Orthoptera
- Suborder: Caelifera
- Family: Acrididae
- Genus: Dissosteira
- Species: D. carolina

Binomial name
- Dissosteira carolina (Linnaeus, 1758)

Synonyms
- Acridium carolinum (Linnaeus, 1758); Acridium (Oedipoda) carolinum (Linnaeus, 1758); Gryllus carolinus Linnaeus, 1758; Gryllus (Locusta) carolinus Linnaeus, 1758; Locusta carolina (Linnaeus, 1758); Oedipoda carolina (Linnaeus, 1758)

Species of insect

Dissosteira carolina, the Carolina grasshopper, Carolina locust, black-winged grasshopper, road-duster or quaker, is a band-winged species of grasshopper which ranges widely in North America inhabiting weedy grasslands.

The Carolina Locust is a short-horned grasshopper (Family Acrididae) found in most of the United States and other parts of North America (Fig 1). These grasshoppers can be anywhere between 32 and 58 mm, with females being larger than males. Their color can range from grey to brown with contrasting black and yellow-white hind wings.

Carolina Locusts are often found on or around dirt roads or paths, where they can easily blend in to gravel and soil. They prefer dry, sunny, open areas for basking, courting displays, and egg laying. Their courtship displays include flying and hovering above the open ground. These males can also call, but their sound is soft and quiet. Their flight is commonly confused for the flight of butterflies.

This species is not known to be a major pest, but some outbreaks have caused some damage in the early 20th century.

== Description ==
Individuals of Dissosteira carolina reach over 32–58 mm in length. They tend to be conspicuous due to their size, colorful wings, and because they habitually fly over dirt roads and other bare ground. The spread wings of the males measure 75 mm across, while those of the females measure 80–102 mm. The tegmina are light brown to tan to gray, tending towards camouflage with the dirt where they bask or hide, whereas the inner wings used for flight are brownish-black with yellow margins and a ridge running down the back. When taking off to escape predators, the black-and-yellow hindwings are revealed extremely quickly, causing the visible portion of the grasshopper to shift from camouflage (~100% brown) to contrast (50+% black-and-yellow) and roughly double in size in less than 9 ms; when landing, the reverse transition occurs in less than 15 ms. Due to these rapid transitions, human observers may see the grasshopper as appearing and disappearing instantaneously. Additionally, during flight, the hindwings transition ~6 times per second between pauses and periods of active wing-beating, during which the wings beat over 30 times per second. This creates an unstable, confusing image. Because of their large size and rather lazy bobbing flight, they are often mistaken for a butterfly, especially the mourning cloak Nymphalis antiopa. Individuals are colored in various shades from golden tan to gray to dark brown to greenish.

== Distribution ==
Dissosteira carolina is found in North America in southern Canada from British Columbia to the Atlantic Coast and in the United States from the east Coast as far south as Florida and as far west as Idaho.

== Biology ==
Dissosteira carolina feeds on both grasses and forbs, but the actual composition of the diet depends on habitat. For example, in a disturbed site that had been reseeded with Bromus inermis and Agropyron cristatum, when the adults' crop contents were examined, 98 percent of the food consumed was Bromus inermis. By contrast, in a disturbed site that had not been reseeded but where weeds had colonised naturally, the adults' crop contents consisted of 33 percent native grasses and 64 percent weeds. In two-choice laboratory tests it was shown that D. carolina readily fed on Bromus tectorum, Bromus inermis, Pascopyrum smithii, wheat, barley, dandelion, and Bassia. However, due to its wide geographical distribution and known polyphagy, D. carolina probably has many potential food plants.

In eastern Wyoming, the hatching of the eggs of D. carolina may begin in early June or it may be delayed until late June. As oviposition occurs in late summer it is probable that the development of the nymph in the egg take place during the following spring. The nymphs emerge from the eggs over a period of at least two weeks to develop within a habitat of grass and weeds interspersed with patches of bare ground. In some areas, however, hatching may be extended over several weeks so that as many as four different instars coexist together. The nymphal period may be 40 days at an altitude of 4,700 feet and 55 days at an altitude of 6,100 feet in Wyoming. Laboratory reared nymphs kept at a constant temperature of 25 °C complete development in 52 days and 26 days at a constant temperature of 30 °C. D, carolina is thermophilic and prefers the hot, bare areas of its habitat.

Adult D. carolina appear earlier in the southern part of their range (e.g. during May in New Mexico) and later in the more northerly parts of its range (e.g. July in northern Idaho). Once they acquire functional wings, they disperse extensively; adults may fly distances of several miles or more, as they have been found in the center of large cities.

In the heat of the day, the male D. carolina take flight and hover, clicking their wings in a courtship display to attract females. Males produce a calling signal by stridulating with hindlegs and wings. The hindlegs are used alternately to rub against the tegmen in a behaviour called alternate stridulation. The male sits horizontally on sunlit bare ground and may continue to stridulate for 5 minutes or more until he is successful in attracting a female. If attracted, the female moves towards the male, and when she is close enough he approaches her and mounts. If he is acceptable to the female they copulate and may remain copulated for as long as 16 hours.

The females take a relatively long time to reach sexual maturity; it may take nine weeks from when the adults emerge to when oviposition commences.

The female selects compacted bare ground which is exposed to the sun in which to oviposit, often the edge of a gravel or dirt road. She works her ovipositor to a depth of 35mm and deposits a large clutch of eggs which are enclosed in a sharply curved pod. After approximately 80 minutes, she extracts her ovipositor and then for up to three minutes she uses her hind tarsi to brush dust and debris over the oviposition site. The pod is nearly 50mm long and usually contains more than 40 eggs.

D carolina is a terrestrial, diurnal grasshopper, although they are attracted to lights on warm summer nights. Adults and nymphs shelter overnight and emerge to bask in the morning sun for two to three hours from roughly two hours after sunrise. After they have basked, the adults begin to walk and fly. Females walk and fly far less than males but feed, groom, and rest more. When the ground temperatures reach 43 °C and air temperatures reach 32 °C, the adults begin to stilt. As temperatures rise, they climb on to vegetation until they are 2.5–7.5 mm above the substrate and face into the sun so that only the front of the head is exposed to the rays and the rest of the body is in shade. In the afternoon the adults bask again on bare ground from about 3 p.m. until 5 p.m. after which they walk or fly to seek shelter, usually under canopies of grasses.

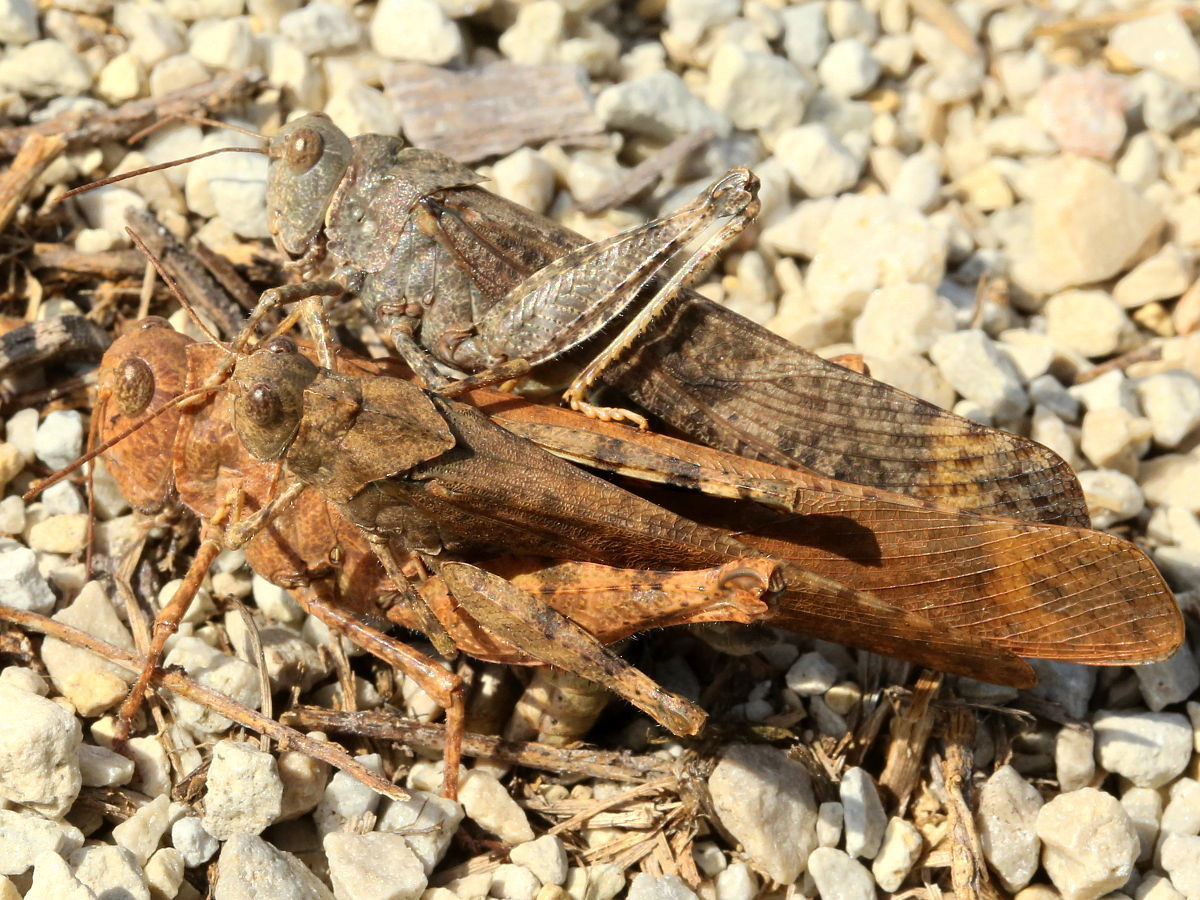
A female ovipositing, guarded by 2 males

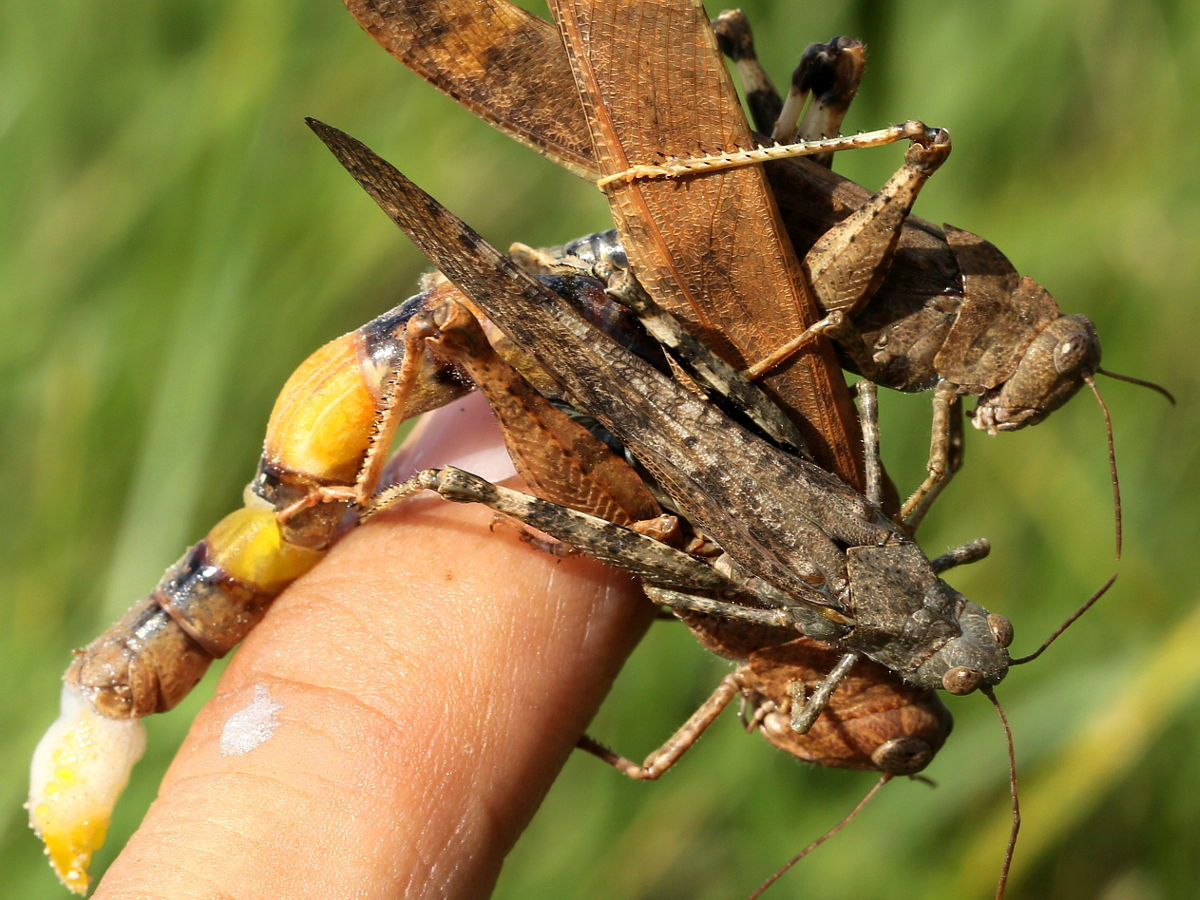
A female guarded by 2 males after ovipositing

Rarely, individual D. carolina are pink. Such individuals do not typically survive predation as they lack the ability to easily blend in with their surroundings. If an adult with the gene manages to reproduce, it is likely to be present in their offspring.

== Predators ==
Dissosteira carolina are preyed on by various animals, including many birds, pallid bats, Carolina wolf spiders, praying mantis, and great black wasps, which struggle to fly with such a heavy load.

== Economic importance ==
Dissosteira carolina is a minor pest of grasses in rangeland. It is most common in disturbed areas, where its main food is several species of weeds. In favorable habitats the populations may irrupt, dispersing and damaging crops. Disturbed areas reseeded with Bromus inermis may give rise to large populations of D. Carolina, which then fly to fields of autumn wheat where they can cause stand damage. Irruptions occurred in southern Saskatchewan in 1933 and 1934, causing considerable damage to the region's crops. Damage has been recorded to alfalfa, and to tobacco in southern Ontario. In 1935, D. carolina was especially destructive to Phaseolus vulgaris or Vicia faba in the vicinity of Flagstaff, Arizona. In Oklahoma, damage has been recorded in maize, sorghum, cotton and potato. To date there have been no detailed studies of the economic importance of D. carolina.

== Gallery ==
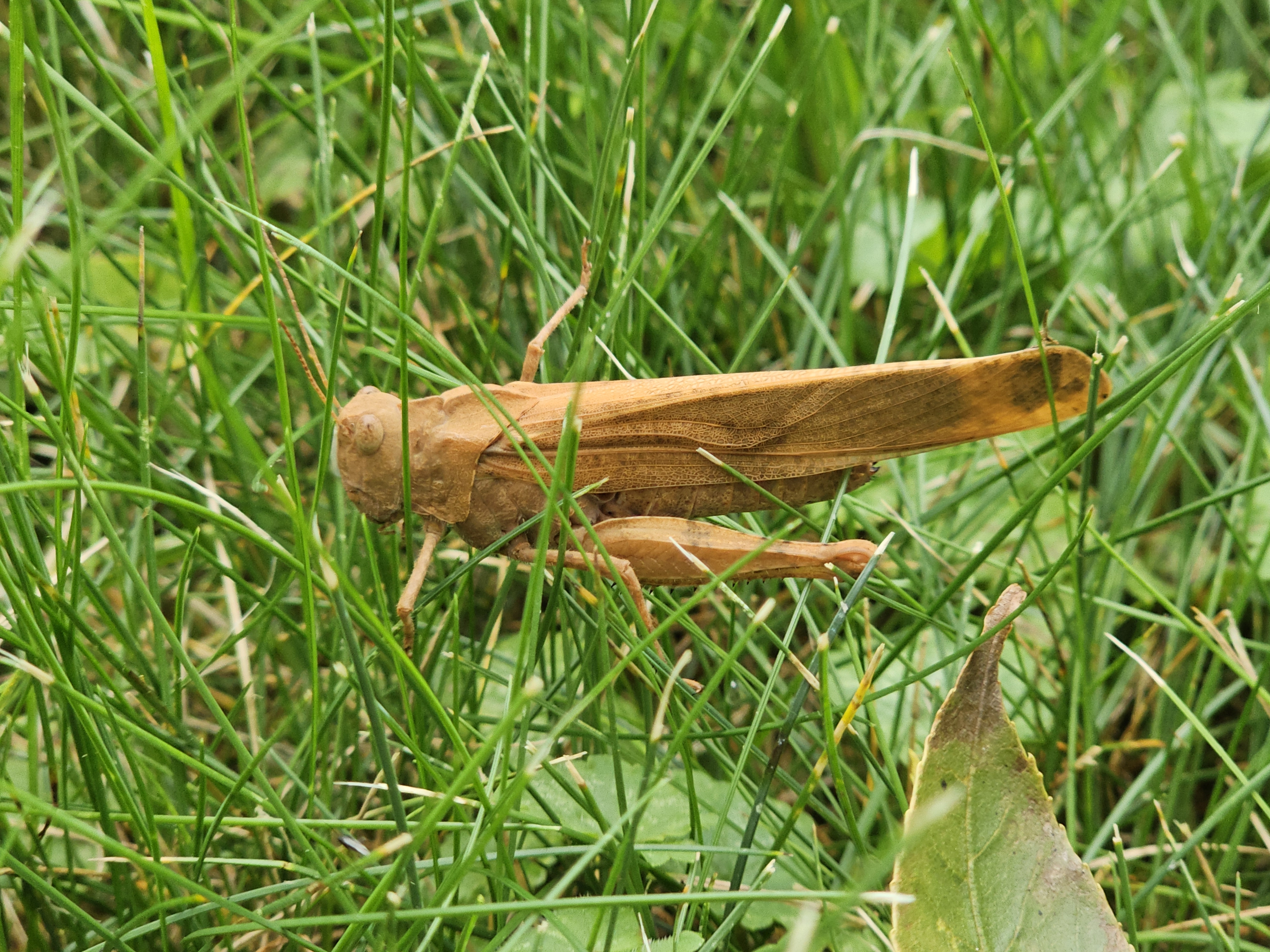
Carolina Locust, Dissosteira carolina in Minnesota
