= High Plains =

High Plains refers to either of two distinct land regions:

- High Plains (United States), land region of the western Great Plains
- High Plains (Australia), land region adjacent to the Great Dividing Range

== See also ==
- Altiplano (disambiguation), Spanish for high plains
- Western Plains (disambiguation), term used in Australia and the US
