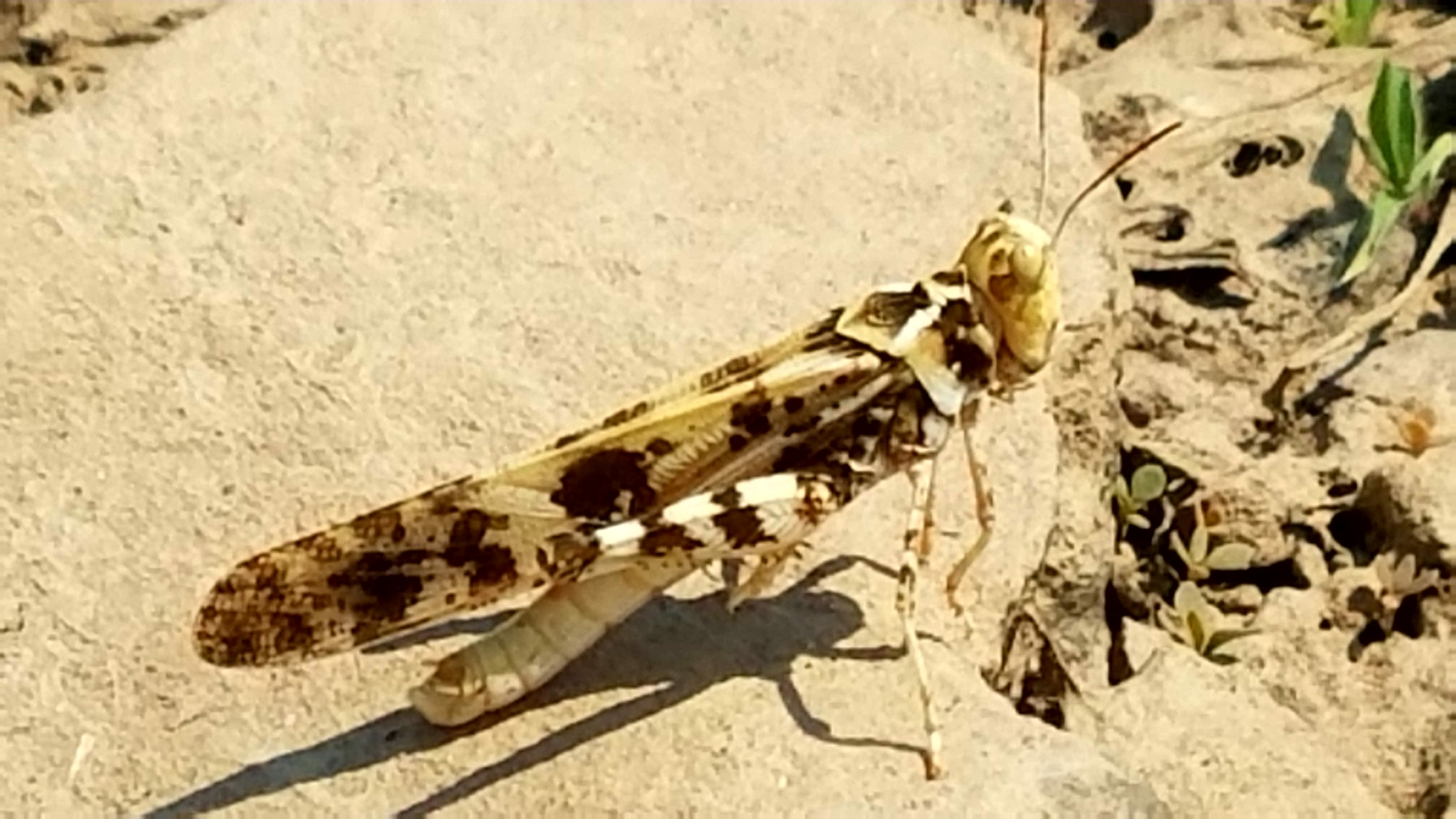

Scientific classification
- Kingdom: Animalia
- Phylum: Arthropoda
- Clade: Pancrustacea
- Class: Insecta
- Order: Orthoptera
- Suborder: Caelifera
- Family: Acrididae
- Tribe: Trimerotropini
- Genus: Dissosteira
- Species: D. spurcata

Binomial name
- Dissosteira spurcata Saussure, 1884

= Dissosteira spurcata =

Species of grasshopper

Dissosteira spurcata, known generally as the spurcate grasshopper or pale-winged grasshopper, is a species of band-winged grasshopper in the family Acrididae. It is found in North America.
