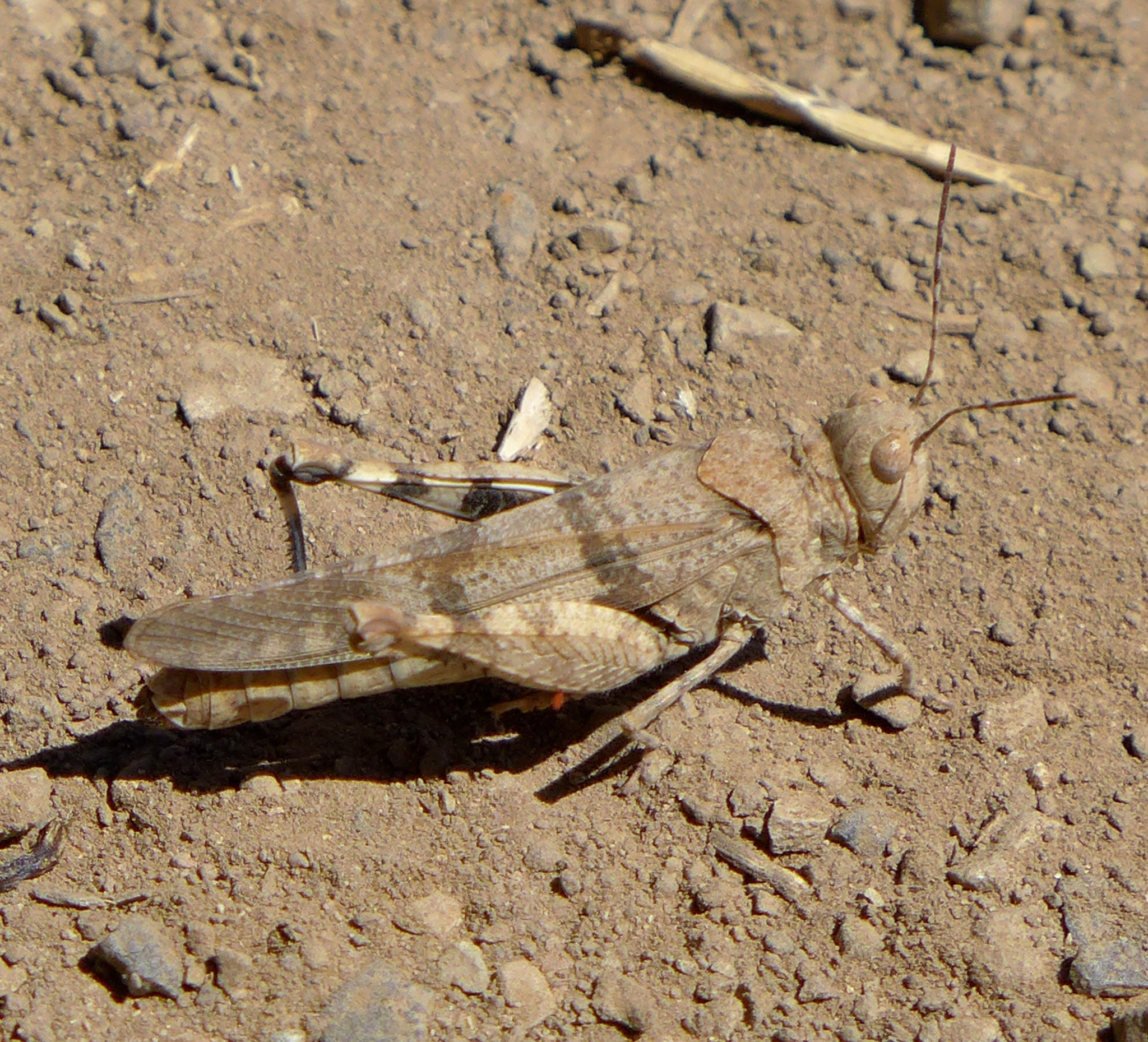

Scientific classification
- Kingdom: Animalia
- Phylum: Arthropoda
- Clade: Pancrustacea
- Class: Insecta
- Order: Orthoptera
- Suborder: Caelifera
- Family: Acrididae
- Tribe: Trimerotropini
- Genus: Dissosteira
- Species: D. pictipennis

Binomial name
- Dissosteira pictipennis Bruner, 1905

= Dissosteira pictipennis =

Species of grasshopper

Dissosteira pictipennis, the California rose-winged grasshopper, is a species of band-winged grasshopper in the family Acrididae. It is found in Central America and North America.
