= Korsun-Shevchenkivskyi urban hromada =

Urban hromada of Cherkasy Oblast, Ukraine

Coordinates: 49°28′N 31°12′E

Korsun-Shevchenkivskyi urban hromada Корсунь-Шевченківська міська громада
- Hromada
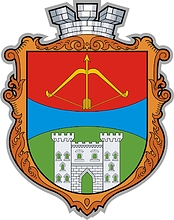
- Seal
- Interactive map of Korsun-Shevchenkivskyi urban hromada
- Country: Ukraine
- Oblast: Cherkasy
- Raion: Cherkasy

Area
  - Total: 176 km^{2} (68 sq mi)

Population
  - Total: 20,913
  - Density: 119/km^{2} (308/sq mi)
- Settlements: 11
- Cities: 1
- Rural settlements: 2
- Villages: 8
- Website: korsun-miskrada.gov.ua

Korsun-Shevchenkivskyi urban territorial hromada (Ukrainian: Корсунь-Шевченківська міська територіальна громада, romanized: Korsun-Shevchenkivska miska terytorialna hromada) is one of the hromadas of Ukraine, in Cherkasy Raion within Cherkasy Oblast. Its administrative centre is the city of Korsun-Shevchenkivskyi.

== Composition ==
The hromada contains 11 settlements: 1 city (Korsun-Shevchenkivskyi), 2 rural settlements (Berliutyne, Zelena Dibrova), and 8 villages:

- Harbuzyn
- Moryntsi
- Nekhvoroshch
- Pishky
- Samoridnia
- Sotnyky
- Sytnyky
- Vyhraiv
