= Altiplano (disambiguation) =

The Altiplano (Spanish for "high plain") is an Andean highland in Bolivia, Peru, and Chile.

Altiplano may also refer to:

== Places ==
- Altiplano Cundiboyacense, a Colombian Andean highland in Cundinamarca and Boyacá
- Altiplano Nariñense, a Colombian Andean highland in Nariño and Putumayo
- Mexican Altiplano, or Mexican Plateau, of northern and central Mexico
- Federal Social Readaptation Center No. 1, "Altiplano", a maximum security federal prison in Mexico
- Altiplano guatemalteco, or Guatemalan highlands, which culturally includes part of Chiapas, south eastern Mexico
- Altiplano de Granada, in Andalucia, Spain
- Altiplano de Yecla-Jumilla, a comarca of Region of Murcia, Spain
- The Altiplano, an elevated valley in Antarctica

== Other uses ==
- Altiplano (2009 film), a drama film directed by Peter Brosens and Jessica Woodworth
- Altiplano (2018 film), an experimental short film directed by Malena Szlam
- Altiplanos, a 2005 album by Pierre Bensusan
