= Districts of the Church of the Brethren =

Church of the Brethren districts

The districts of the Church of the Brethren are twenty-four regional divisions that serve to administer approximately one thousand congregations of the Church of the Brethren in the United States and Puerto Rico. Districts are divided along state and county lines with membership and geographic scope varying widely.

The Church of the Brethren is present in thirty-four U.S. states, Puerto Rico, and Washington, D.C. in addition to its overseas missions.

== History and purpose ==
The district system has existed among Schwarzenau Brethren since 1856—prior to the 1881–1883 split—and served the administrative purpose of determining delegates to the Annual Conference who could represent the interests of various communities and report the proceedings back to church leaders.

Delegates from districts serve the purpose of raising issues at annual conferences (called "queries"), which affect members of the Church of the Brethren at large or which have a scope greater than that of a single congregation or locality, e.g. the ordination of women or how to regulate funds for missions activities. Due to the increase in queries presented to the Annual Conference, in 1856, the Brethren approved the establishment of districts of no less than five churches that would answer queries that had a local scope.

== List of districts ==
Name	Territory(ies)	Congregations
Atlantic Northeast	Delaware (1), Maine (3), New Jersey (1), New York (3), Pennsylvania (71)	79
Atlantic Southeast	Florida (19), Puerto Rico (9)	28
Idaho	Idaho	6
Illinois and Wisconsin	Illinois (38), Wisconsin (1)	39
Michigan	Michigan	20
Mid-Atlantic	Delaware (1), Maryland (46), Pennsylvania (2), Virginia (8), Washington, D. C. (1), West Virginia (4)	62
Middle Pennsylvania	Maryland (1), Pennsylvania (54)	55
Missouri and Arkansas	Arkansas (2), Missouri (13)	15
Northern Indiana	Indiana (39), Michigan (1)	40
Northern Ohio	Michigan (1), Ohio (50)	51
Northern Plains	Iowa (26), Minnesota (6), Montana (1)	33
Oregon and Washington	Oregon (4), Washington (12)	16
Pacific Southwest	Arizona (3), California (25)	28
Shenandoah	Virginia (87), West Virginia (10)	97
South/Central Indiana	Indiana	48
Southeastern	Alabama (3), North Carolina (13), South Carolina (1), Tennessee (17), Virginia (8)	42
Southern Ohio	Indiana (1), Kentucky (4), Ohio (49)	54
Southern Pennsylvania	Pennsylvania	44
Southern Plains	New Mexico (1), Oklahoma (4), Texas (3)	8
Virlina	North Carolina (6), Virginia (79), West Virginia (5)	90
Western Plains	Colorado (9), Kansas (27), Nebraska (4), New Mexico (1)	41
West Marva	Maryland (15), Pennsylvania (1), West Virginia (47)	64
Western Pennsylvania	Pennsylvania	70

== Churches by territory ==
Territory	District(s)	Number
Alabama	Southeastern	3
Arizona	Pacific Southwest	3
Arkansas	Missouri and Arkansas	2
California	Pacific Southwest	25
Colorado	Western Plains	9
Delaware	Atlantic Northeast (1), Mid-Atlantic (1)	2
Florida	Atlantic Southeast	19
Idaho	Idaho	6
Illinois	Illinois and Wisconsin	38
Indiana	Northern Indiana (45), South/Central Indiana (48), Southern Ohio (2)	95
Iowa	Northern Plains	26
Kansas	Western Plains	27
Kentucky	Southern Ohio	4
Maine	Atlantic Northeast	3
Maryland	Mid-Atlantic (43), Middle Pennsylvania (1), West Marva (19)	63
Michigan	Michigan (19), Northern Indiana (1), Northern Ohio (1)	21
Minnesota	Northern Plains	6
Missouri	Missouri and Arkansas	13
Montana	Northern Plains	1
Nebraska	Western Plains	4
New Jersey	Atlantic Northeast	1
New Mexico	Western Plains (1), Southern Plains (1)	2
New York	Atlantic Northeast	3
North Carolina	Southeastern (14), Virlina (6)	20
Ohio	Northern Ohio (51), Southern Ohio (47)	98
Oklahoma	Southern Plains	4
Oregon	Oregon and Washington	4
Pennsylvania	Atlantic Northeast (71), Mid-Atlantic (2), Middle Pennsylvania (54), Southern Pennsylvania (44), West Marva (1), Western Pennsylvania (70)	242
Puerto Rico	Atlantic Southeast	9
South Carolina	Southeastern	1
Tennessee	Southeastern	17
Texas	Southern Plains	3
Virginia	Mid-Atlantic (8), Shenandoah (87), Southeastern (7), Virlina (79)	181
Washington	Oregon and Washington	12
Washington, D. C.	Mid-Atlantic	1
West Virginia	Mid-Atlantic (4), Shenandoah (10), Virlina (5), West Marva (47)	66
Wisconsin	Illinois and Wisconsin	1

== Churches outside the United States ==
A map of the worldwide scope of the Church of the Brethren: Headquarters of the Church (United States and Puerto Rico) Current overseas missions (Brazil; the Dominican Republic; Haiti; Nigeria and Oku, Cameroon; and Southern Sudan) Churches that are the result of mergers with other Protestant missions (Ecuador's United Andean Indian Mission and the Church of North India; a single Indian church still belongs to the Church of the Brethren) Foreign missions that have closed (Argentina, China, Denmark and Sweden, France and Switzerland, Indonesia, Niger, and Turkey)

The Church of the Brethren began missionary activities in the late 19th century, which included the establishment of churches in Africa, the Americas, Asia, and Europe. Although most foreign missions closed by the middle of the 20th century, several remain worldwide.

The most successful such mission has been Ekklesiyar Yan'uwa a Nigeria (EYN) (Hausa for "Church of the Children of the Same Mother"), the Nigerian church which was granted autonomy in 1975.

=== Former foreign missions ===
Canada
Alberta
- Arrowwood, Bow Valley (1917–68)
- Irricana (1910–68)
- Mountain View (1907–22)
- Pleasant Ridge (1908–17)
- Pleasant Valley (1909–20)
- Redcliffe Mission (1917–?)
- Second Irricana (1924–64)
- Sharon (1906–17)

Saskatchewan
- Fairview (1903–33)
- Merrington (1920–49)
- Vidora: Battle Creek (1910–56)

Mainland China
Guangdong
- On Fun, San Tai (1918–48)
Shanxi
- Tsin (Chin) Chou
- Liao Chou (1912–50)
- Ping Ting Choll (1912–50)
- Shou Yang Hsien (Show Yang) (1919–50)
- T'ai Yuan Fu (1923–50)

Cuba
- Omaja (1908?–19)
