= Józef Wereszczyński =

Józef Wereszczyński (born 1530 in Zbaraż, died 1598) was a Polish political writer, polemicist, moralist, preacher, and bishop of Kiev.

He was probably born in Zbaraż, in 1530, as the son of Andrzej of Ruthenian origin, and Anna née Jaroski (Jaroski or Jarocki). He grew up and was educated in Krasnystaw. It is not known where he obtained his doctorate in theology. Before 1577 he became a canon of Chełmno. In 1581 he became an abbot of the Benedictine monastery in Sieciechów. In 1587 he supported the candidacy of Sigismund III Vasa. In 1592 he became the bishop of Kiev.
