= Wawrzyniec Dayczak =

Polish architect (1882–1968)

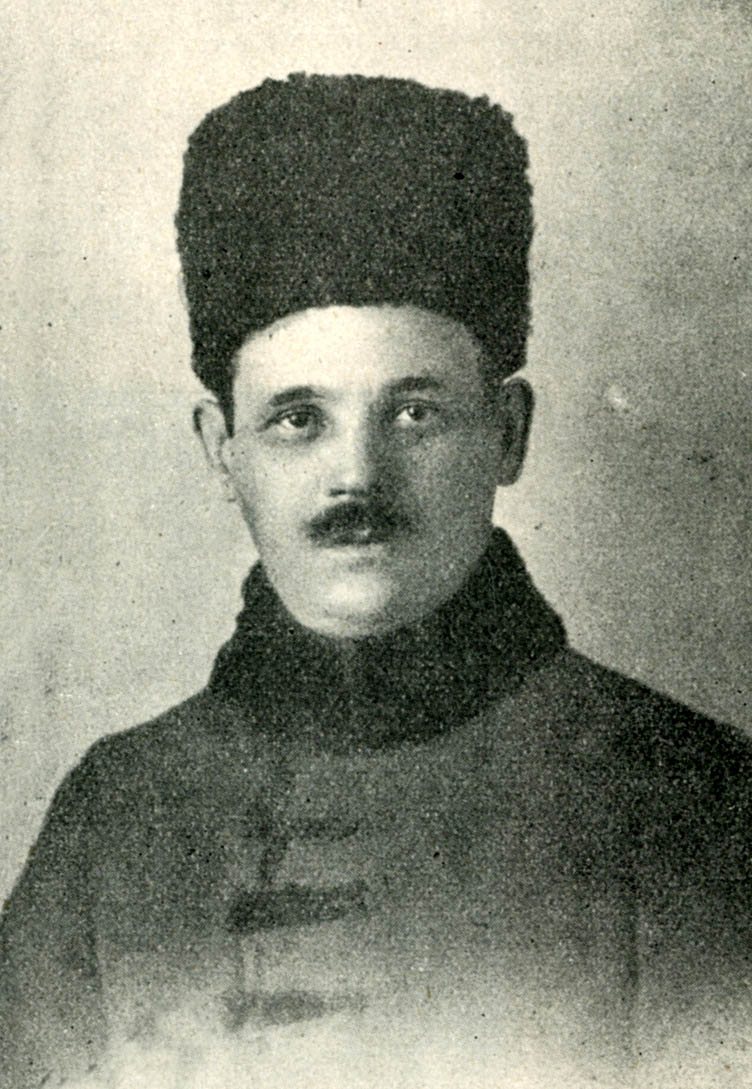
- Born: 27 August 1882; Reniów (near Załoźce), Kingdom of Galicia and Lodomeria, Austria-Hungary
- Died: 28 April 1968 (aged 85); Jarosław, Polish People's Republic
- Resting place: Powązki Cemetery
- Education: Lviv Polytechnic
- Occupations: Architect; Independence activist

Wawrzyniec Dayczak (27 August 1882 – 28 April 1968) was a Polish architect and independence activist.

== Early life and education ==
Dayczak was born on August 27, 1882, in the region of Podolia, in a village of Reniów (Reniv) near the town of Załoźce (Zaliztsi) in the former Ternopil Province. He was the oldest son of a peasant named Maciej (Matthias). After graduating from the classical gymnasium in Brody, he studied at the Technical University of Lviv Faculty of Architecture, completing his diploma in 1915.

== Career ==
In the gymnasium, he established contact with the clandestine inter-partitional organization, Association of the Polish Youth "Zet". These activities continued from 1904 to 1905, reaching the highest ranks of Zet: "Koło Brackie Zetu" (Zet Fraternity).

In 1905, he was a courier to Warsaw, participating in the preparatory work for a students' strike. Simultaneously, he worked as an activist within the eastern section of the inter-partitional socio-educational organization People's School Society. In 1908, he founded Bartosz Brigades -Poland's first period of independence, a partition organization of rural youth. He was the Chief of Headquarters Teams Bartoszowych. After graduating in 1915, he was appointed to the Austrian army.

He was a member of the General Headquarters of Defence Lvov, head of the Polish mobilization of Military Personnel in Lvov in 1918. In early 1919, he was seconded to Warsaw in connection with the formulation of the relief. In 1920, he served in the volunteer army in Lviv.

He designed and built about 100 churches. Churches his mostly rural churches. In the years 1945–1964 continued to teach in the field of architecture and construction at the State School Building in Jarosław.

== Death ==
He died on April 28, 1968, in Jarosław and was buried at Powązki Cemetery in Warsaw.
