= Podolia =

Historical region in Eastern Europe

Podolia Поділля Podillia
- Historical region
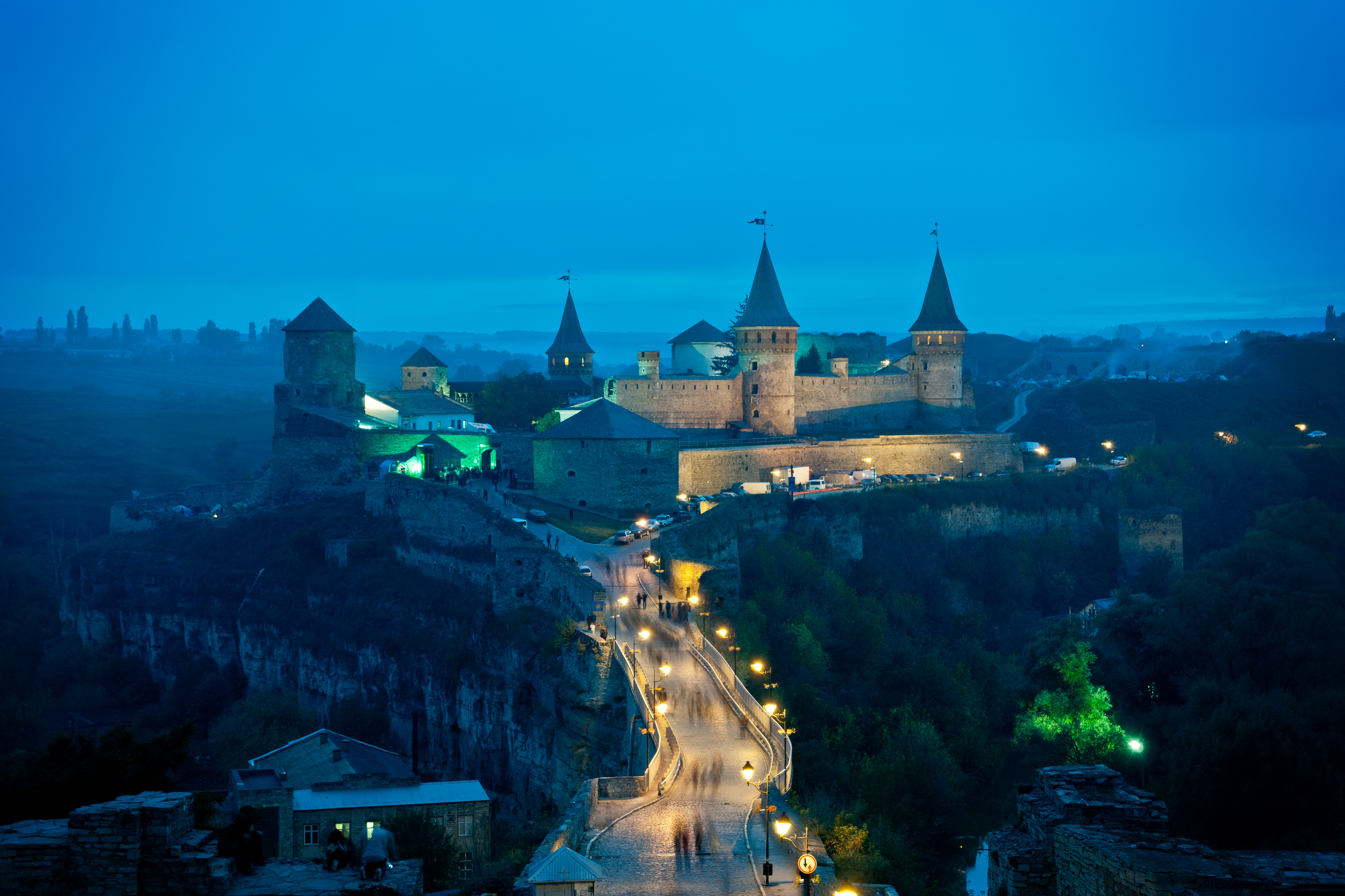
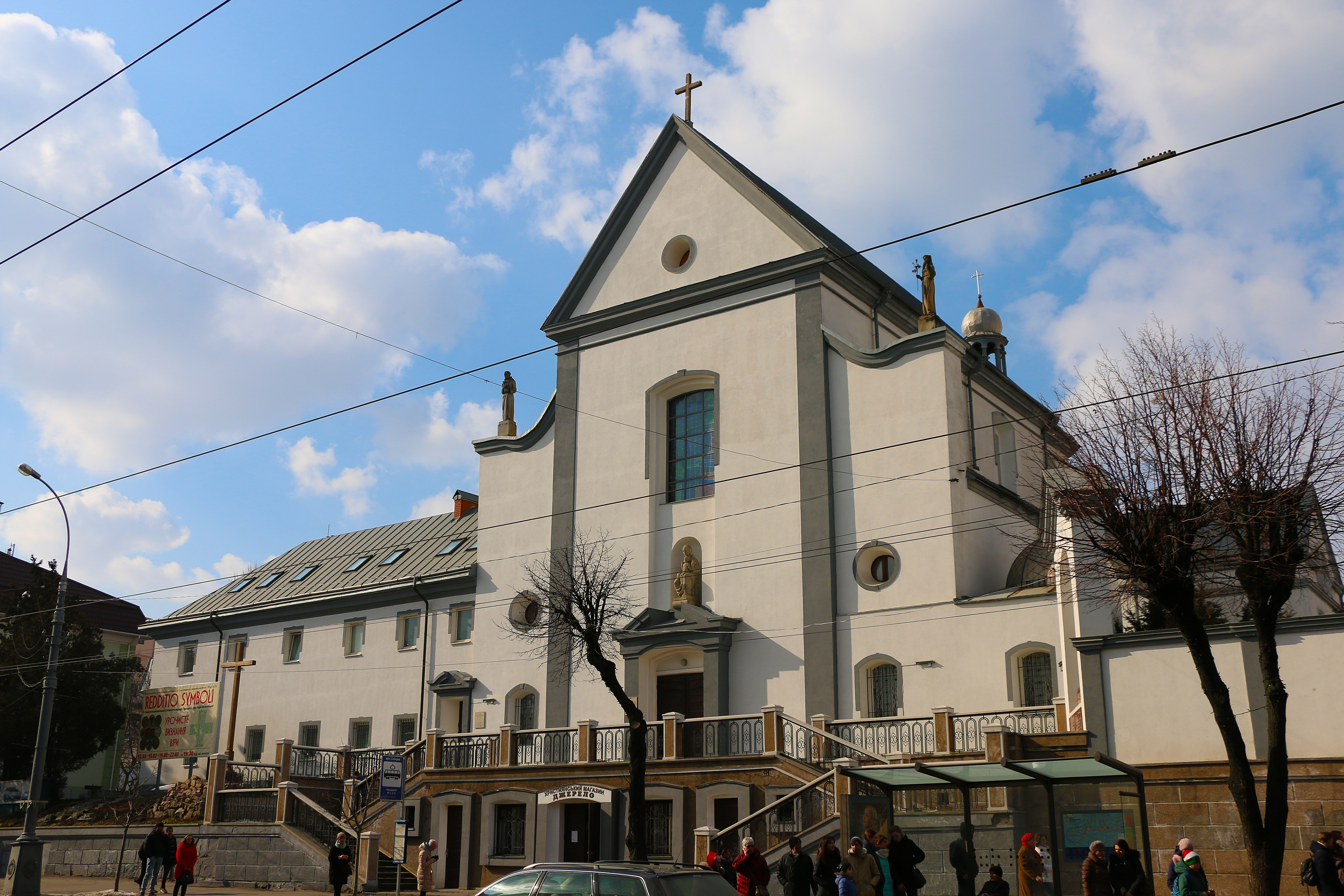
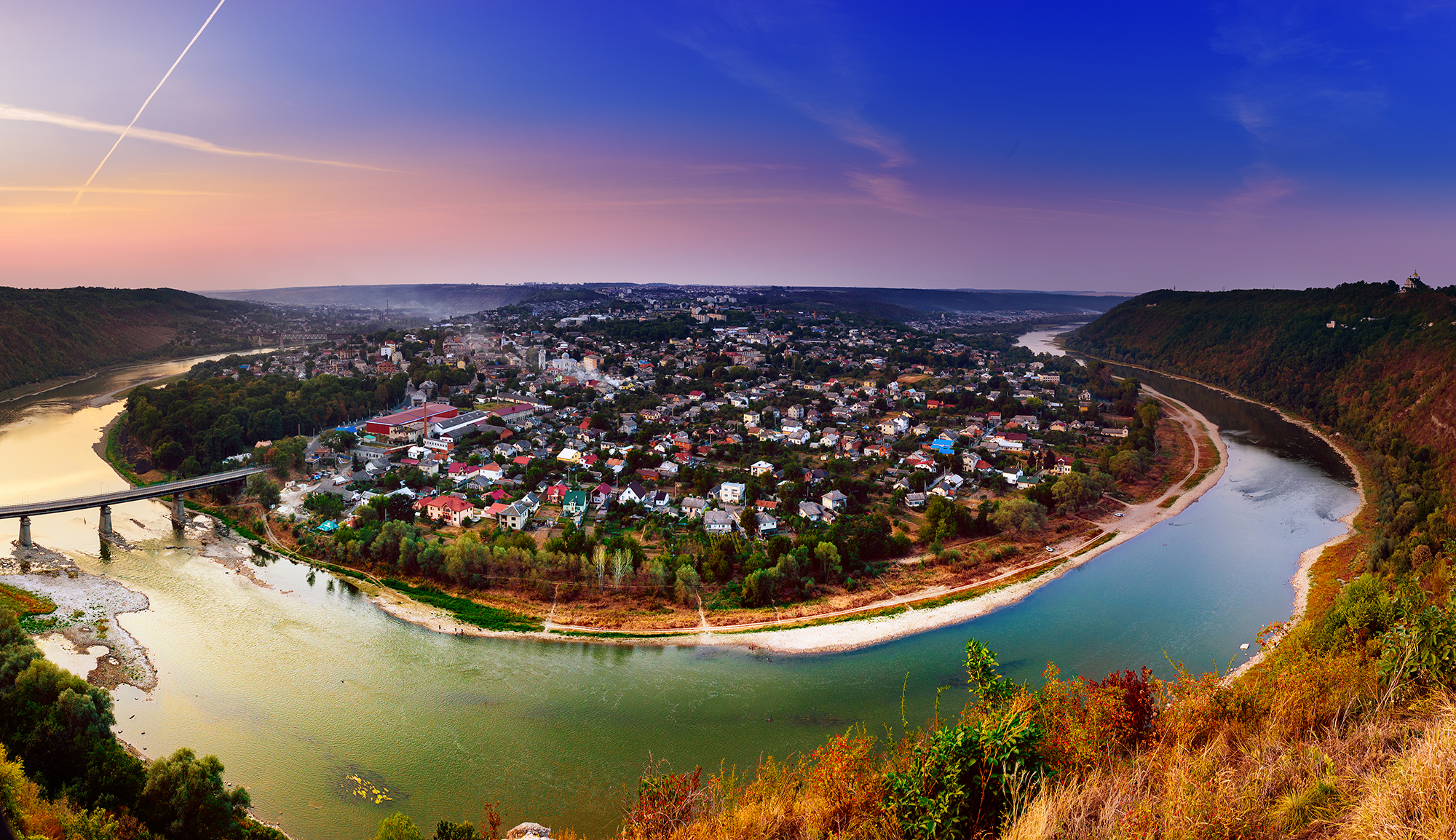
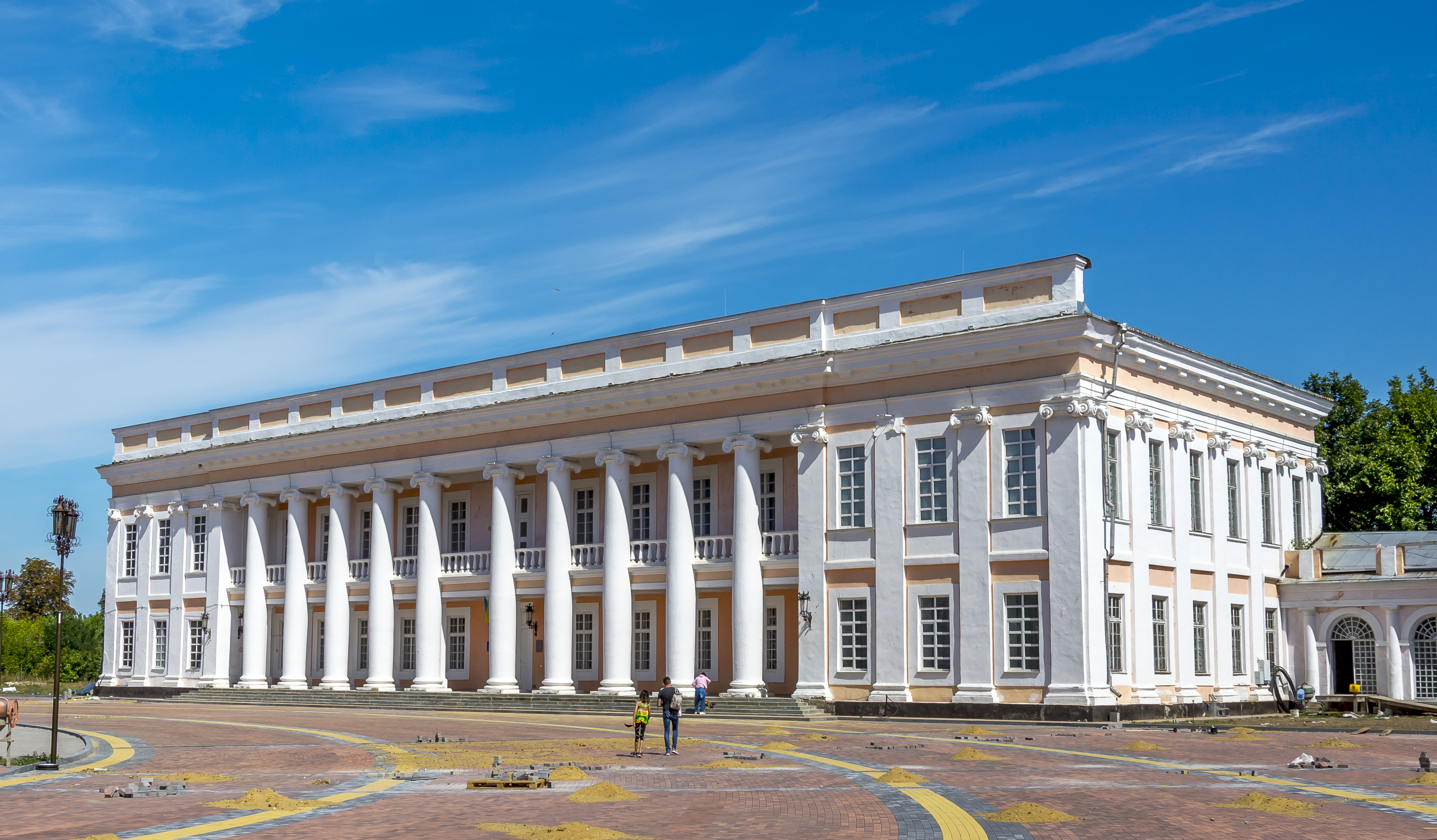
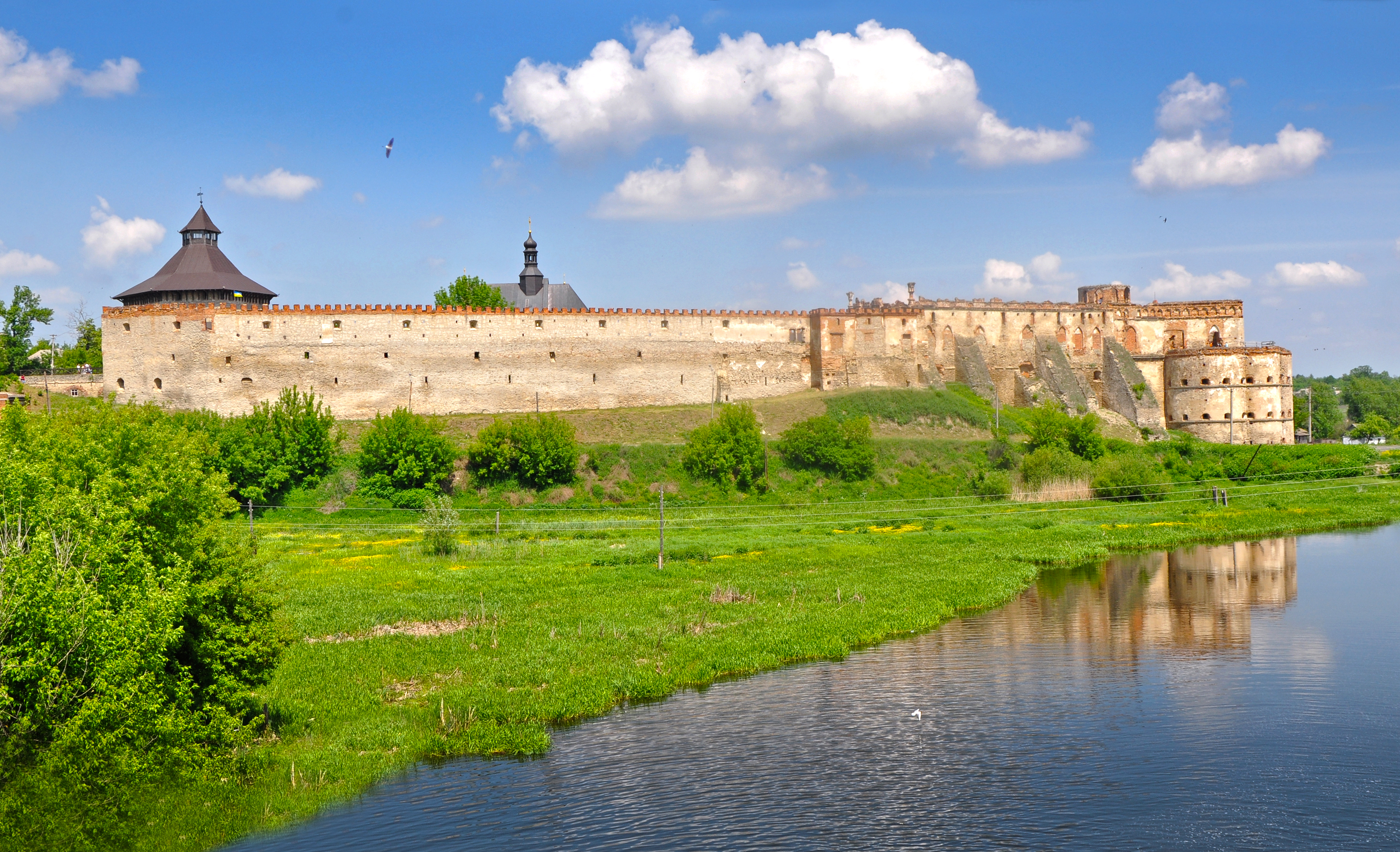
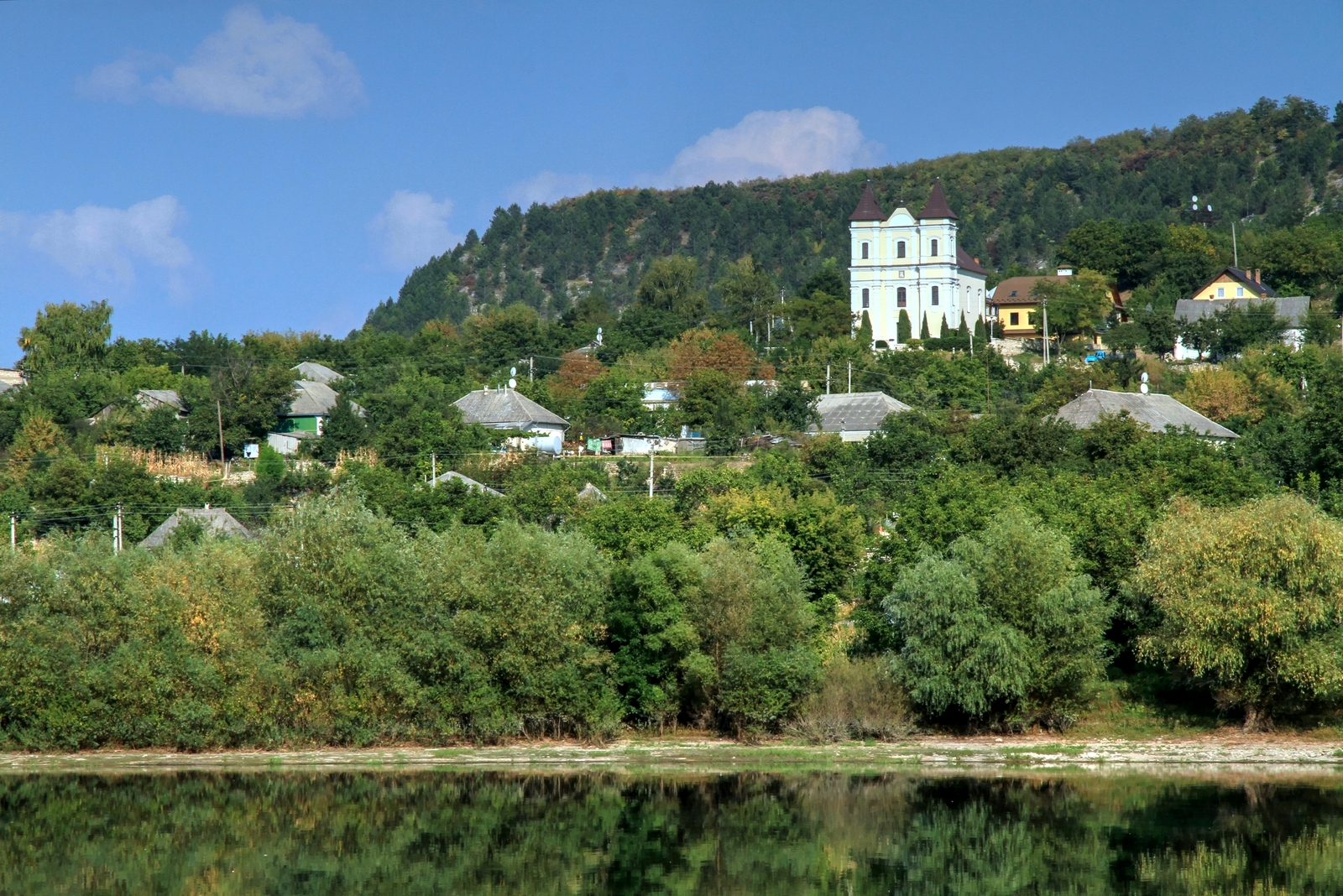
- Fortress in Kamianets-Podilskyi Capuchin monastery in Vinnytsia Zalishchyky Potocki Palace in Tulchyn Medzhybizh Fortress Panorama of Rașcov

- Coat of arms

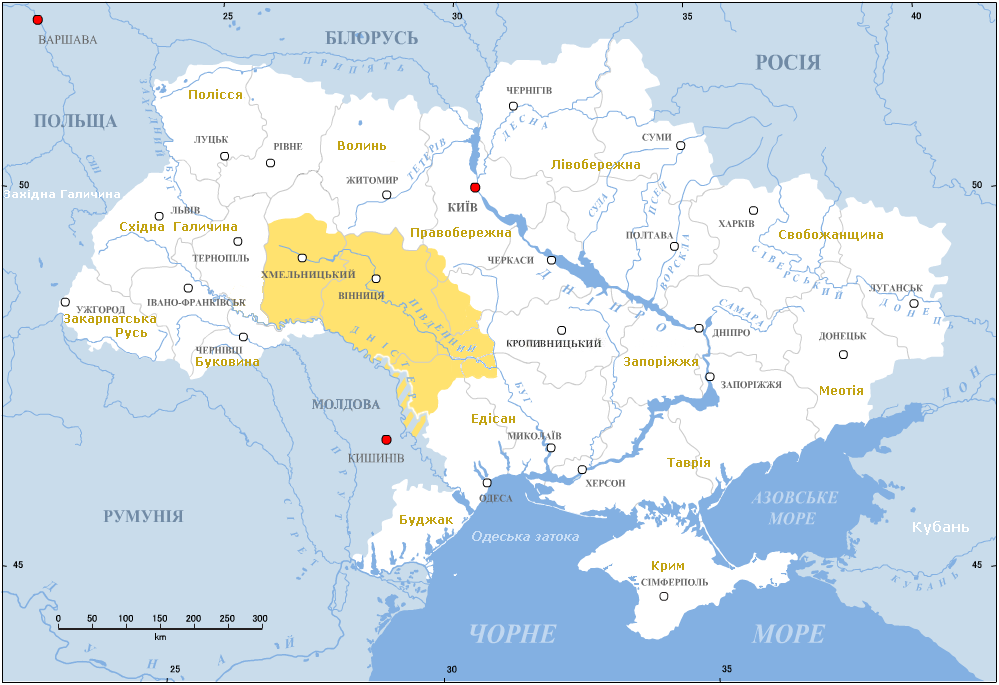
- Podolia (yellow) in modern Ukraine
- Country: Ukraine, Moldova
- Region: West Ukraine, Central Ukraine, Transnistria
- Historical capital: Kamianets-Podilskyi
- Largest city: Vinnytsia
- Parts: Ternopil Oblast, Khmelnytskyi Oblast, Vinnytsia Oblast, Odesa Oblast, Cherkasy Oblast, Left Bank of the Dniester
- Time zone: UTC+2 (EET)
  - Summer (DST): UTC+3 (EEST)

Podolia or Podillia (Note: Ukrainian: Поділля, romanized: Podillia, IPA: [poˈd⁽ʲ⁾ilʲːɐ]; Romanian: Podolia; Russian: Подолье, romanized: Podolye, IPA: [pɐˈdolʲjɪ]; Polish: Podole; Lithuanian: Podolė; German: Podolien; Belarusian: Падолле, romanized: Padollie; Yiddish: פּאָדאָליע, romanized: Podolye.) is a historic region in Eastern Europe located in the west-central and southwestern parts of Ukraine and northeastern Moldova (i.e. northern Transnistria).

Podolia is penetrated by Southern Buh river and bordered by the Dniester River to the south. It features an elongated plateau and fertile agricultural land covering an area of 40,000 square kilometres (15,000 sq mi). The two main rivers serve as important trade channels. Podolia is known for its cherries, mulberries, melons, gourds, and cucumbers.

The region has a rich history, dating back to the Neolithic, with various tribes and civilizations occupying it over time. It became part of the Kingdom of Galicia–Volhynia, the Golden Horde, the Kingdom of Poland, the Grand Duchy of Lithuania, the Ottoman Empire, the Habsburg monarchy of Austria, and the Russian Empire. In the 20th century, Podolia underwent various political changes, with both the Second Polish Republic and the Soviet Union controlling parts of it at different times.

Podolian culture is renowned for its folk icon-painting tradition, with red, green, and yellow colors dominating the art. These iconic works can be collected in the Vinnytsya Art Museum and the Museum of Ukrainian Home Icons in Radomysl Castle.

== Etymology ==
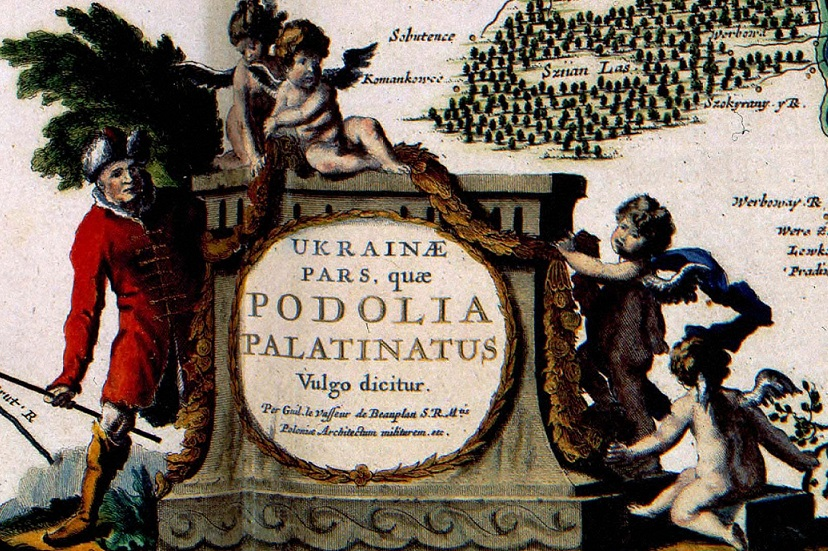
Maps title reads Podolian Voivodeship, part of Ukraine

The name Podolia or Podillia derives from Proto-Slavic *po lit. 'by, next to, along' and *dolъ lit. 'valley, lowland' (cf. English dale, Dutch dal, German Tal). It shares this same root meaning with Podil, the Lower City of Kyiv. As with many Proto-Slavic nouns, such as домъ (domŭ "home, house"), the vowel /o/ shifted to /i/ in Ukrainian (дім dim), but not in Belarusian (дом dom), Polish (dom), or Russian (дом dom). Therefore, most languages render the toponym as Podol-, but inside Ukraine itself, it is Podil-. The letters -ia derive from the grammatical convention in Latin toponymy to add the suffix -ia to the names of countries or regions. The extra -л- (-l-) in written Ukrainian is added for proper pronunciation.

== Geography ==
The area is part of the vast East European Plain, confined by the Dniester River and the Carpathian arc in the southwest. It comprises an area of about 40,000 km^{2} (15,000 sq mi), extending for 320 km (200 mi) from northwest to southeast on the left bank of the Dniester. In the same direction, the Southern Bug separates two ranges of relatively low hills. The Podolian Upland, an elongated, up to 472 ft (144 m) high plateau stretches from the Western and Southern Bug rivers to the Dniester. It includes mountainous regions with canyon-like fluvial valleys.

Podolia lies east of historic Red Ruthenia, i.e. the eastern half of Galicia, beyond the Seret River, a tributary of the Dniester. In the northwest, it borders on Volhynia. It is primarily made up of the present-day Ukrainian Vinnytsia Oblast and southern and central Khmelnytskyi Oblast. The Podolian lands also include parts of the adjacent Ternopil Oblast in the west and Kyiv Oblast in the northeast. In the east, it consists of the neighbouring parts of Cherkasy, Kirovohrad and Odesa Oblast, as well as the northern half of Transnistria.

Two large rivers, with numerous tributaries, drain the region: the Dniester, which forms its boundary with Moldova and is navigable throughout its length, and the Southern Bug, which flows almost parallel to the former in a higher, sometimes swampy, valley, interrupted in several places by rapids. The Dniester forms an essential channel for trade in the areas of Mohyliv-Podilskyi, Zhvanets, and other Podolian river ports.

In Podolia, chernozem "black earth" soil predominates, making it a very fertile agricultural area. Marshes occur only beside the Bug. A moderate climate predominates, with average temperatures at Kamianets-Podilskyi of 9 °C (−4 °C in January, 20 °C in July).

Russian-ruled Podolia in 1906 had an estimated population of 3,543,700, consisting chiefly of Ukrainians. Significant minorities included Poles and Jews, as well as 50,000 Romanians, some Germans, and some Armenians.

The chief settlements include Kamianets-Podilskyi, the traditional capital, Vinnytsia, Khmelnytskyi, Rîbnița, Mohyliv-Podilskyi, Haisyn, Balta, Bar, Camenca, Yampil, Bratslav, and Letychiv.

Podolia is known for its cherries, mulberries, melons, gourds, and cucumbers.

== History ==
=== Early history ===
The region has had human inhabitants since at least the beginning of the Neolithic period. Herodotus mentions it as the seat of the Graeco-Scythian Alazones and possibly the Neuri. Subsequently, the Dacians and the Getae arrived. The Romans left traces of their rule in Trajan's Wall, which stretches through the modern districts of Kamianets-Podilskyi, Nova Ushytsia, and Khmelnytskyi.

During the Migration Period, many peoples passed through this territory or settled within it for some time, leaving numerous traces in archaeological remains. Nestor in the Primary Chronicle mentions four apparently Slavic tribes: the Buzhans and Dulebes along the Southern Bug River, and the Tivertsi and Ulichs along the Dniester. The Avars invaded in the 7th century. Later. the Bolokhoveni occupied the same territory in the 13th century.

Prince Oleg extended his rule over this territory known as the Ponizie, or "lowlands". These lowlands later became a part of the principalities of Volhynia, Kiev, and Galicia. In the 13th century, Bakota served as its political and administrative centre.

=== Lithuanian and Polish rule ===
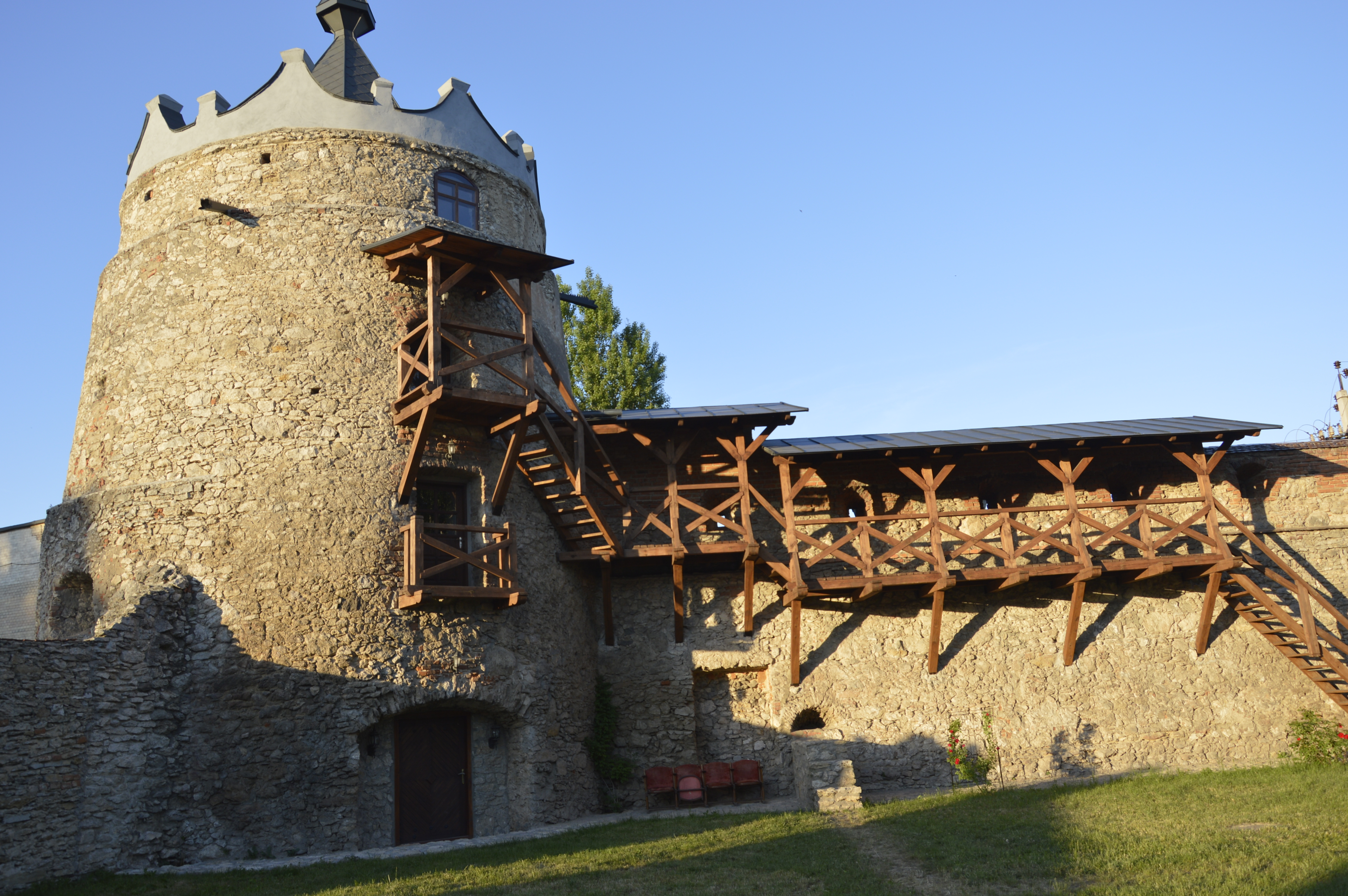
Medieval fortress in Letychiv

During the 13th century, the Mongols plundered Ponizie; Algirdas, Grand Duke of Lithuania, freed it from their rule following his victory against the Golden Horde in the Battle of Blue Waters of 1362, annexing it to Lithuania under the name of Podolia, which has the same meaning as Ponizie, and in 1366 western Podolia with Kamieniec Podolski passed under Polish sovereignty. In 1375, the Roman Catholic Diocese of Kamianets-Podilskyi was founded. Polish colonisation began in the 14th century. The Tale about Podolia, written after 1430, describes – from the Lithuanian point of view – the struggle between Poland and Lithuania for control of "the Podolia Land" (which is given equal prominence as "the Lithuanian Land").

After the death of the Grand Duke of Lithuania Vytautas in 1430, Podolia was incorporated into Podolian Voivodeship of the Kingdom of Poland, with the exception of its eastern part, the Bracław Voivodeship, which remained with Lithuania, both forming part of the Polish–Lithuanian union. In the early 16th century, the Volhynian noble Ostrogski family gained complete or partial control over both western Podolia, the Kyivan land, and their own Volhynian land. With the Union of Lublin of 1569, within the newly formed Polish–Lithuanian Commonwealth, eastern Podolia passed from Lithuania to Poland, thus reuniting western and eastern Podolia within the same realm. The Volhynian nobles at Lublin voted in favour of the transfer from Lithuania to Poland. The Kamieniec Podolski Fortress was nicknamed the "gateway to Poland", whereas the city of Kamieniec Podolski itself as one of Poland's major cities enjoyed voting rights during the royal election period. In 1580, a royal decree by Stephen Báthory mentioned 'Ruthenian, Kyivan, Volhynian, Podolian, and Bratslavian Ukraine', meaning that the Commonwealth authorities regarded all these voivodeships along the steppe frontier as a group, that could jointly be called "Ukraine".

In the mid-17th century, Guillaume Le Vasseur de Beauplan considered Podolia to be part of Ukraine in his Description of Ukraine, as well as his General Map, Special Map, and other maps of Ukraine. Even though the 1649 Treaty of Zboriv excluded Podolia from the Cossack Hetmanate's territory, both the Cossacks and their opponents generally considered Podolia to be part of Ukraine in a wider sense. Khmelnytsky defeated the Commonwealth forces in the Battle of Batih in Podolia in 1652, but because he ordered the Batih massacre (in which several thousand Poles were murdered by the Cossacks) thereafter in revenge for the Battle of Berestechko (1651), this aggravated the Commonwealth into more decisive military measures to put an end to the Khmelnytsky Uprising. The 1653 Siege of Zhvanets in Podolia resulted in a stalemate.

Podolia and south Kyiv Voivodeship on the 1613 Radziwiłł map

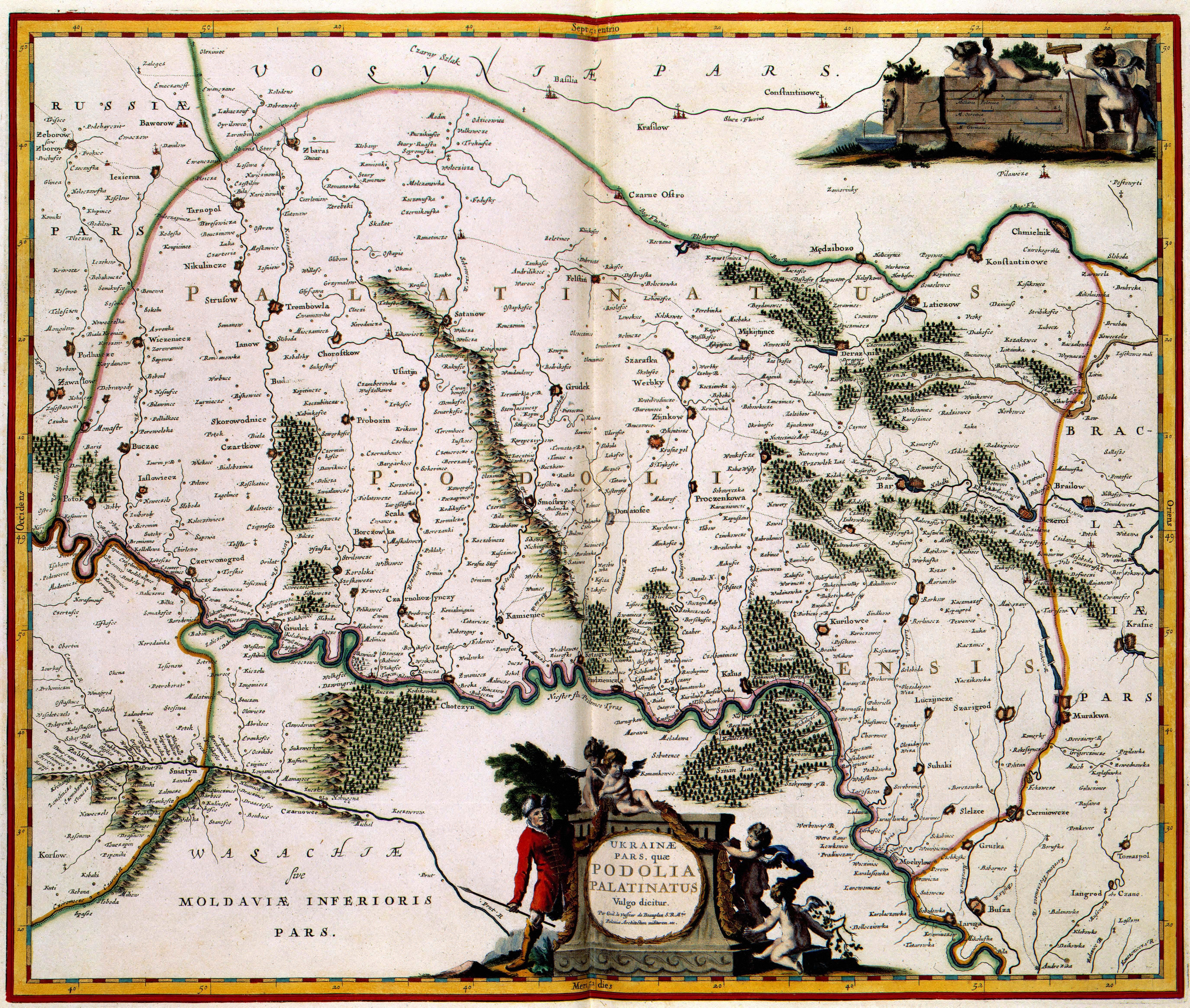
Podolian Voivodeship or western Podolia (Beauplan 1664)

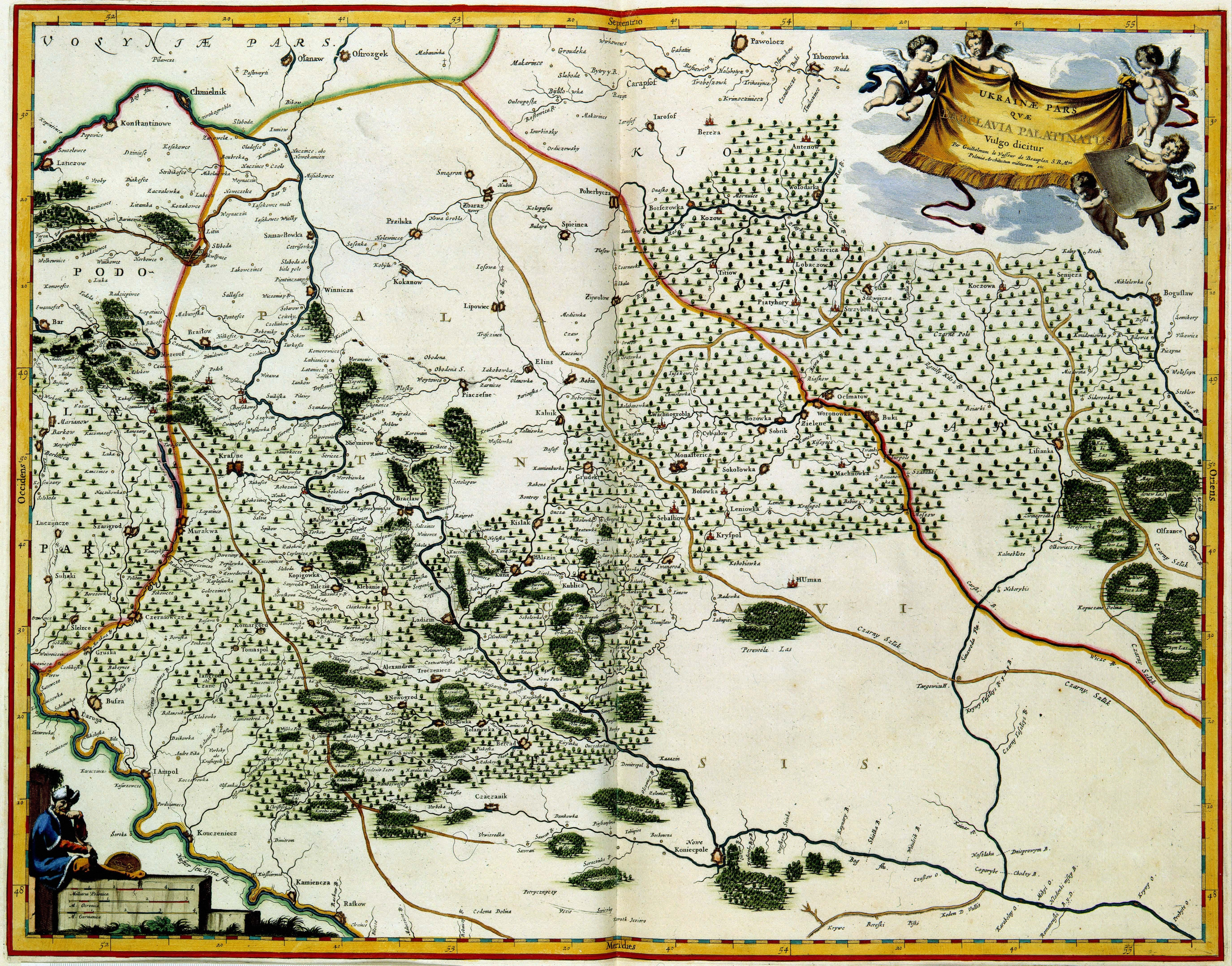
Bratslav Voivodeship or eastern Podolia (Beauplan 1664)

=== Ottoman period ===
The Crimean Khanate had so far generally fought on the side of the Ukrainian Cossacks, but at crucial times the khan had abandoned them; after Zhvanets 1653, he began to cooperate more systemically with the Commonwealth.

Podolia was the target of frequent Tatar slave raids. Podolia was invaded several times by the Crimean Tatars and Turks, and during the Deluge, also by Transylvanians and Russians, with notable Polish victories at Udycz (1606), Czarny Ostrów (1657), Uścieczko (1694).

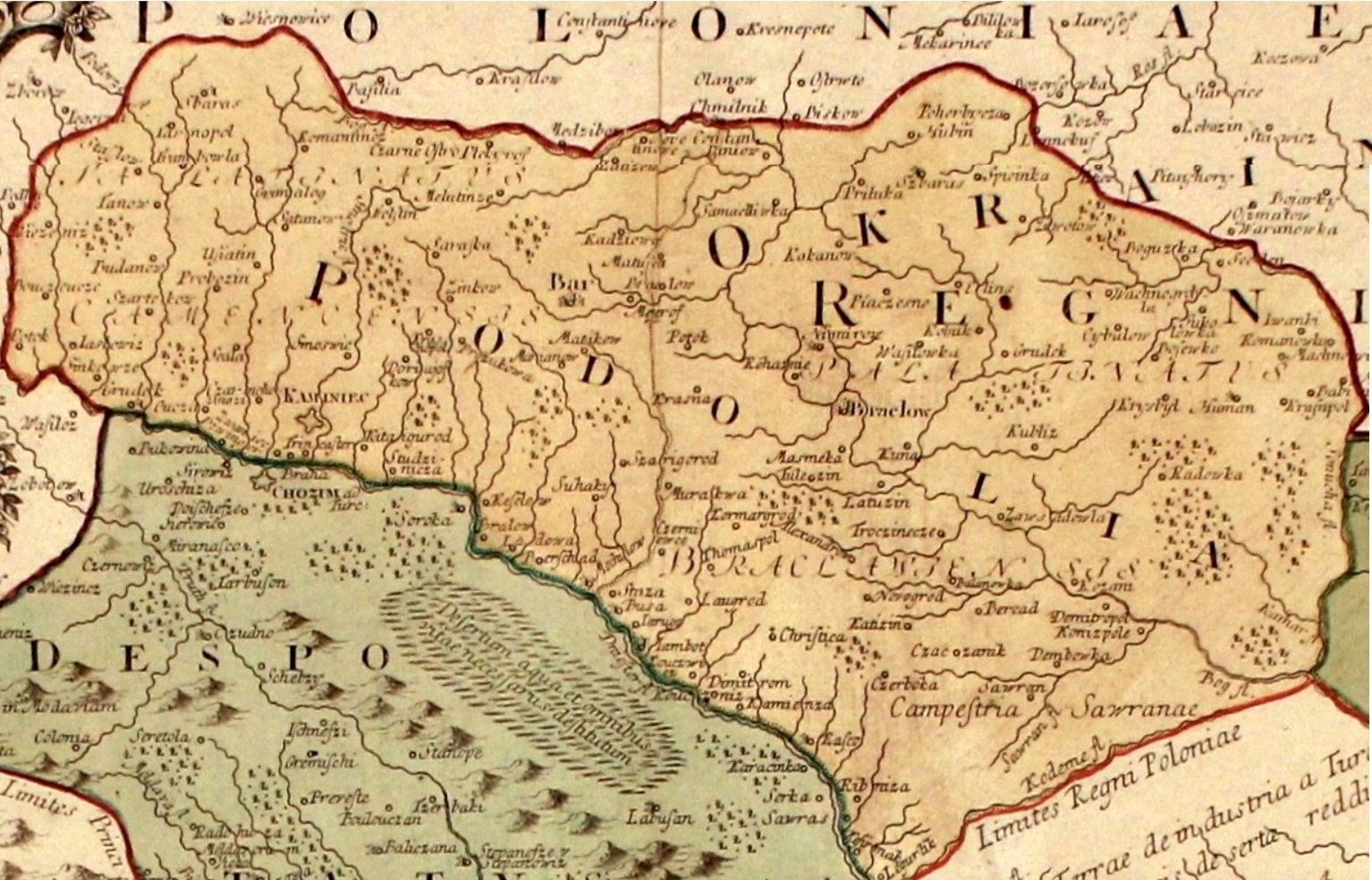
Map of Podolia from 1769

From 1672, Podolia became part of the Ottoman Empire, when and where it was known as Podolia Eyalet. During this time, it was a province, with its center being Kamaniçe, and was divided into the sanjaks of Kamaniçe, Bar, Mejibuji and Yazlovets (Yazlofça).

The Commonwealth tried to regain Podolia and other areas of the Right Bank in subsequent decades. The Restoration of Cossackdom in Right-bank Ukraine (1685), entailing the re-establishment of the Cossack regiments and an overarching Hetmanate based in Nemyriv, was a series of decisions taken by king Jan III Sobieski and the Sejm of the Commonwealth to accomplish this.

It returned to Poland in 1699 with the Treaty of Karlowitz.

=== 18th century ===
Right-bank Ukraine in 1764. Podolia Voivodeship (western Podolia) Bratslav Voivodeship (eastern Podolia) South Kyiv Voivodeship

After the liquidation of Cossackdom in Right-bank Ukraine (1699), Podolia, Bratslav, the Kyivan land and surrounding regions were engulfed in the Paliy uprising (1700–1704). Due to the intervention of Left-bank Hetman Ivan Mazepa, the revolt was ended and Paliy arrested. But as the Swedish and Russian invasions of Poland were ongoing and there was anarchy in western Ukraine, the former Right-bank Cossack rebels including Hetman Samiilo Samus swore loyalty to Mazepa, who proceeded to drive out the Polish nobility from Podolia and the rest of western Ukraine in the autumn of 1705.

The region was the site of the Massacre of Uman of 1768, in which several thousand Poles, Jews and Uniates were murdered by haidamaks.

In 1768, the Bar Confederation was formed by the Poles, including Casimir Pulaski in Bar in Podolia. Podolia remained part of the Polish–Lithuanian Commonwealth until its Partitions of Poland in 1772 and 1793, when the Austrian and Russian Empires annexed the western and eastern parts respectively.

=== Russian and Austrian rule ===
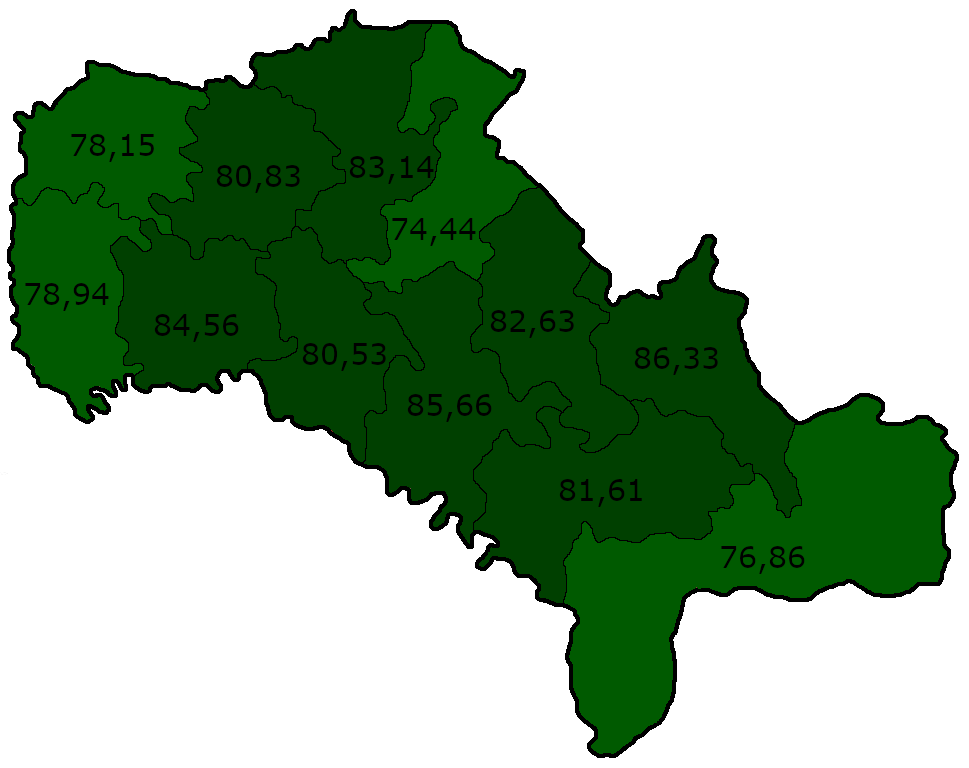
Percentage of Ukrainian-speakers in the uezds of the Podolia Governorate according to the 1897 census.

From 1793 to 1917, part of the region was the Podolia Governorate in southwestern Russia bordering with Austria across the Zbruch River and with Bessarabia across the Dniester. Its area was 36,910 km^{2} (14,251 sq mi).

In 1772 First Partition of Poland, the Austrian Habsburgs had taken control of a small part of Podolia west of the Zbruch River (sometimes also called "Southern Podolia") around Borschiv, in what is today Ternopil Oblast. At this time, Emperor Joseph II toured the area, was impressed by the fertility of the soil, and was optimistic about its future prospects. Poland disappeared as a state in a third partition in 1795 but the Polish gentry continued to maintain local control in both eastern and western Podolia over a peasant population which was primarily ethnically Ukrainian whose similarity to the other East Slavs already subject to the Habsburg monarchy was showcased in a 1772 book by Adam F. Kollár and was used as an argument in favor of annexation by the Habsburgs. The Ternopil (Tarnopol) region of western Podolia was briefly taken by Russia in 1809 but reverted to Austrian rule in 1815. Within the Austrian Empire, western Podolia was part of the Kingdom of Galicia and Lodomeria which, in 1867 with the formation of Austria-Hungary, became an ethnic Pole-administered autonomous unit under the Austrian crown. At the end of the nineteenth century and the beginning of the twentieth, Austrian Podolia witnessed a large-scale emigration of its peasant population to western Canada.

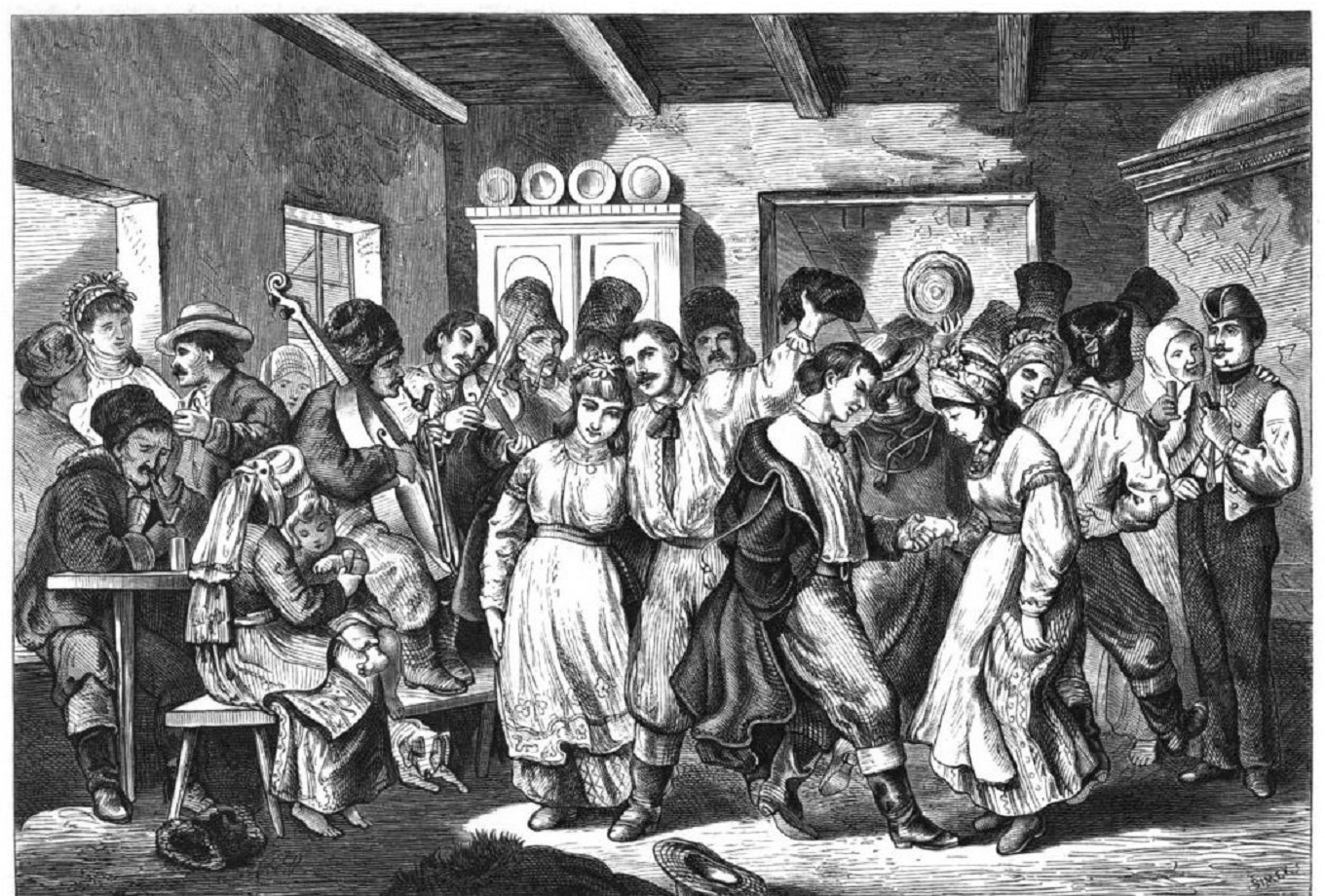
Podolians, before 1878

Several battles of the Polish uprisings of 1809, 1830–1831 and 1863–1864 were fought in Podolia.

As to the Jewish community in Podolia, the Haskalah or Jewish Enlightenment reached it in the 19th century, introduced by Jews from Western Europe. Says I A. Bar-Levy (Weissman), author of the "Yizkor Book" for Podolia: "It brought an end to the cultural separation of Jews from the surrounding world. Jews began to learn modern sciences and languages, read world literature and participate in the cultural life of the nations among whom they lived." Just as was the case in other areas of former Poland, Jews started to learn the language of the country they lived in and to write about secular subjects. The writers of the Haskalah in Podolia included: the forerunner Isaac Satanow (1733–1805), Menachim Mendel Lapin, author and translator, Ben-Ami (Mordecai Rabinowitz), who wrote in Russian, and many others.

=== Between Poland and the Soviet Union ===
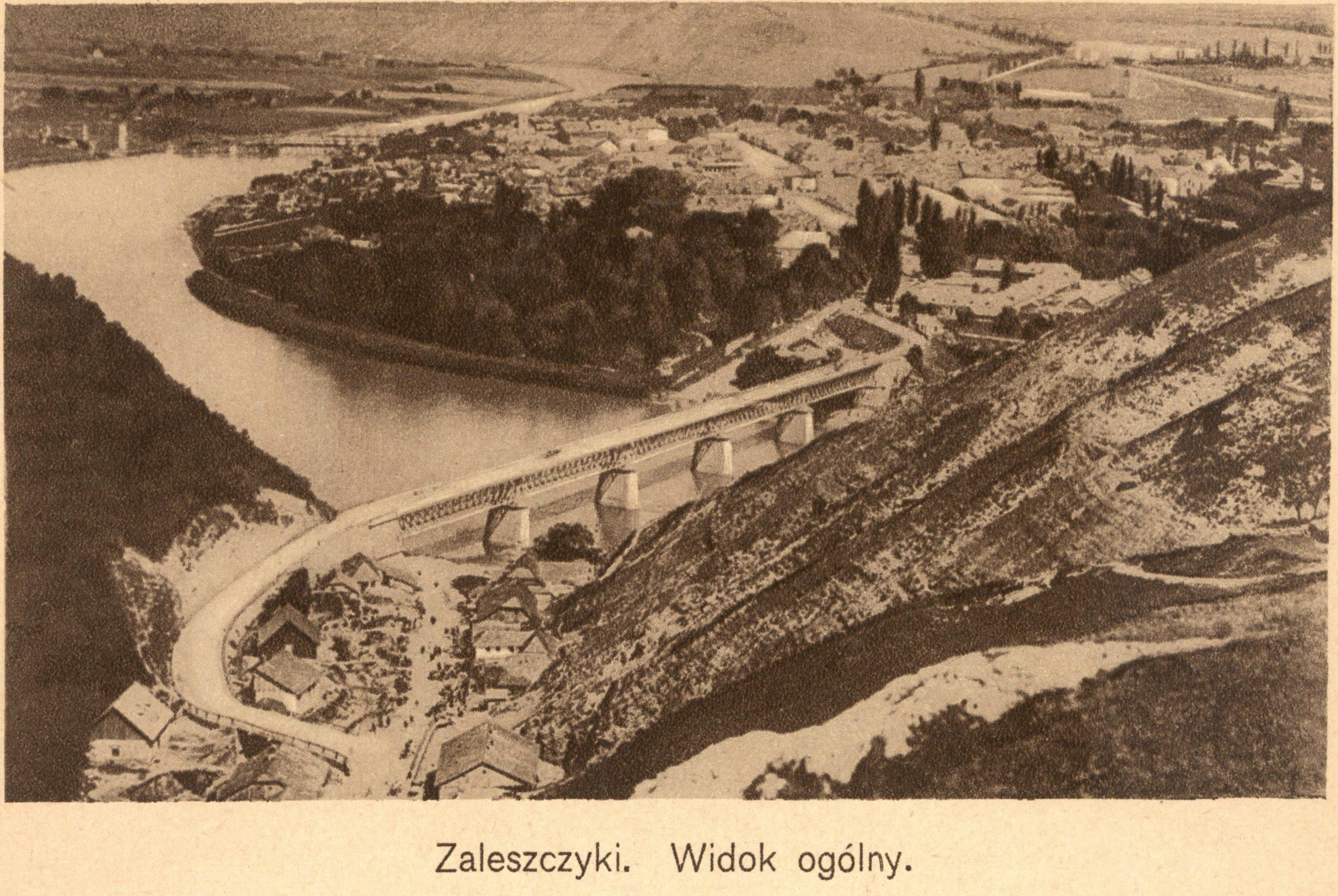
Zaleszczyki in then Polish western Podolia before 1939

With the collapse of Austria-Hungary following World War I in November 1918, western Podolia was included in the West Ukrainian People's Republic, but came under Polish control in 1919 which was confirmed in the Poland–Ukrainian People's Republic agreement in April 1920. Podolia was briefly occupied in 1920 by Soviets during the course of the Polish–Soviet War. At same war, Poland briefly occupied eastern Podolia in 1919 and again in 1920. After the Peace of Riga the Polish control of western Podolia was recognized by the USSR. USSR retained eastern Podalia. There were pogroms during this period.

In Poland from 1921 to 1939, western Podolia was part of the Tarnopol Voivodeship. Eastern Podolia remained in the Ukrainian SSR and between 1922 and 1940, in the southwestern part, the Moldavian Autonomous Soviet Socialist Republic was created.

In 1927 there was a massive uprising of peasants and factory workers in Mohyliv-Podilskyi, Kamianets-Podilskyi, Tiraspol and other cities of southern Ukrainian SSR against Soviet authorities. Troops from Moscow were sent to the region and suppressed the unrest, causing around 4000 deaths, according to US correspondents sent to report about the insurrection, which was at the time completely denied by the Kremlin official press.

In 1939 after the signing of the Molotov–Ribbentrop Pact between Nazi Germany and the Soviet Union and the Soviet invasion of Poland on September 17, 1939, the area became part of Soviet Ukraine. Many local inhabitants were deported to labour camps. In January 1940, the Czortków uprising, an unsuccessful Polish uprising against Soviet occupiers, took place in pre-war Polish Podolia. Following German invasion of the Soviet Union in 1941, most of Podolia was occupied by Nazi Germany and incorporated into the Reichskommissariat Ukraine. The area of Podolia between the Southern Bug below Vinnytsia and the Dniester was occupied by Axis Romania as part of Transnistria.

Starting in July 1941, the Jewish inhabitants were subjected to mass extermination by shooting in a German campaign carried out by four Einsatzgruppen ("operational groups") specially organized for the purpose. Reliable estimates including German, Soviet, and local records indicate that upwards of 1.6 million, perhaps as many as 2 million, Jews were murdered in this fashion. Most were buried in mass graves, but there were also instances of communities being forced en masse into community buildings or synagogues that were then burnt, or herded into local mines that were subsequently dynamited.

The Germans operated the Stalag 310, Stalag 329, Stalag 349 and Stalag 355 prisoner-of-war camps in Podolia.

In 1944 the Soviets re-occupied Podolia and in 1945, when Poland's eastern border was formally realigned along the Curzon line, the whole of Podolia remained in the Ukrainian and Moldavian Soviet Socialist Republics. Most remaining Poles and Jews fled or were expelled to the People's Republic of Poland.

== Culture ==
The Podillia's folk icon-painting tradition is well known in Ukraine. Its manifestation is long home iconostases painted on canvas at the end of the 19th to the beginning of the 20th centuries. Red, green and yellow colours prevail, the faces of the saints are a little bit longer, their eyes almond-like. On these iconostases, the most venerated family saints were painted. The collections of Podillya's folk iconostases are possessed by Vinnytsya Art Museum and The Museum of Ukrainian Home Icons in the Radomysl Castle. Podillia is also notable as the birthplace of the Baal Shem Tov, the founder of Hasidic Judaism, and as the cradle of Frankism, a controversial Jewish religious sect of Sabbateanism.

== Notable people ==
- Jan Potocki (1761–1815), ethnologist, linguist, traveller and author
- Wawrzyniec Dayczak (1882–1968), architect and activist
- Benjamin Antin (1884–1956), lawyer and Democratic politician
- Yukhym Sitsinskyi (1859–1937), historian, archaeologist, cultural and public figure of Podillia

== Gallery ==
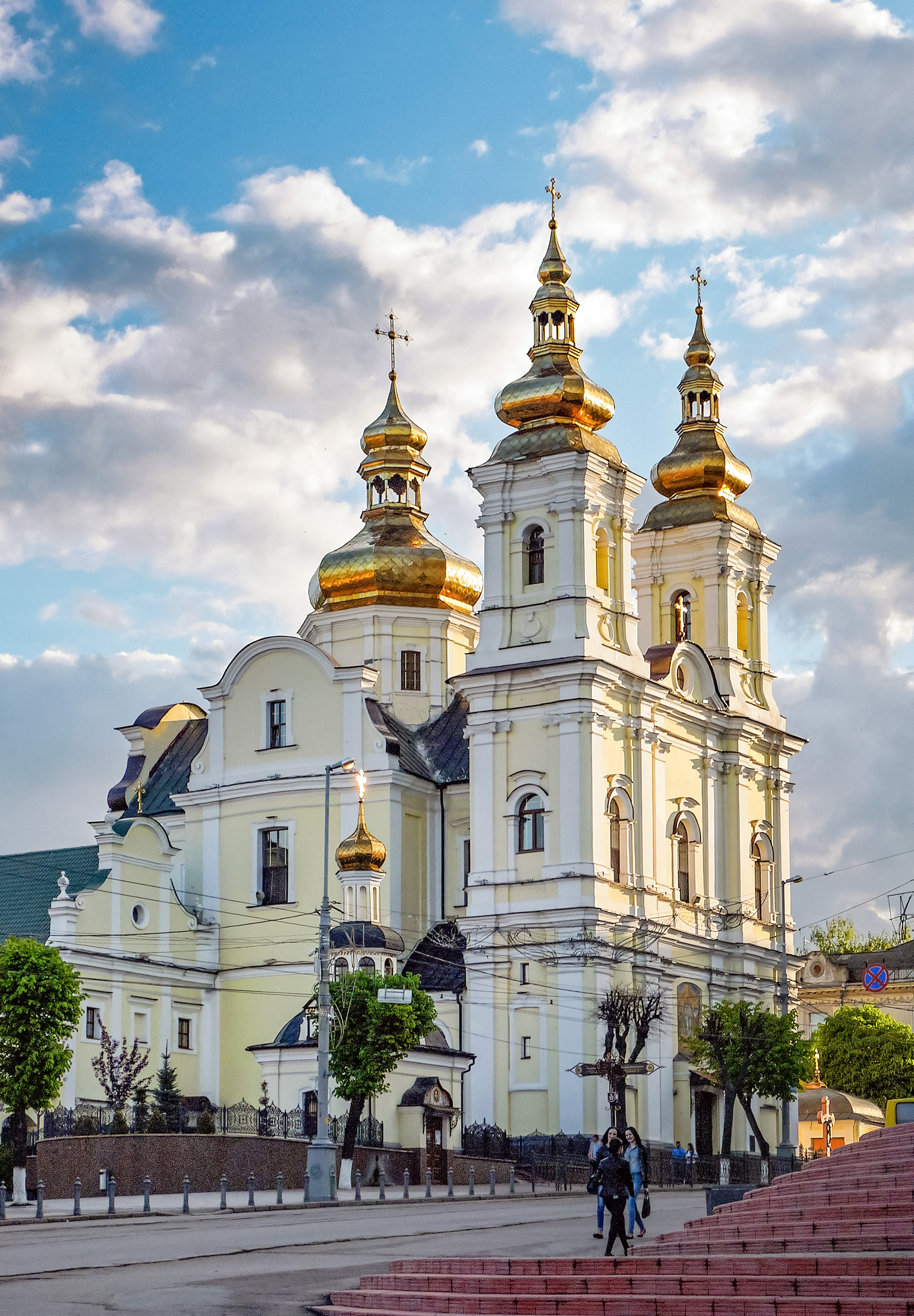
Dominican monastery, Vinnytsia

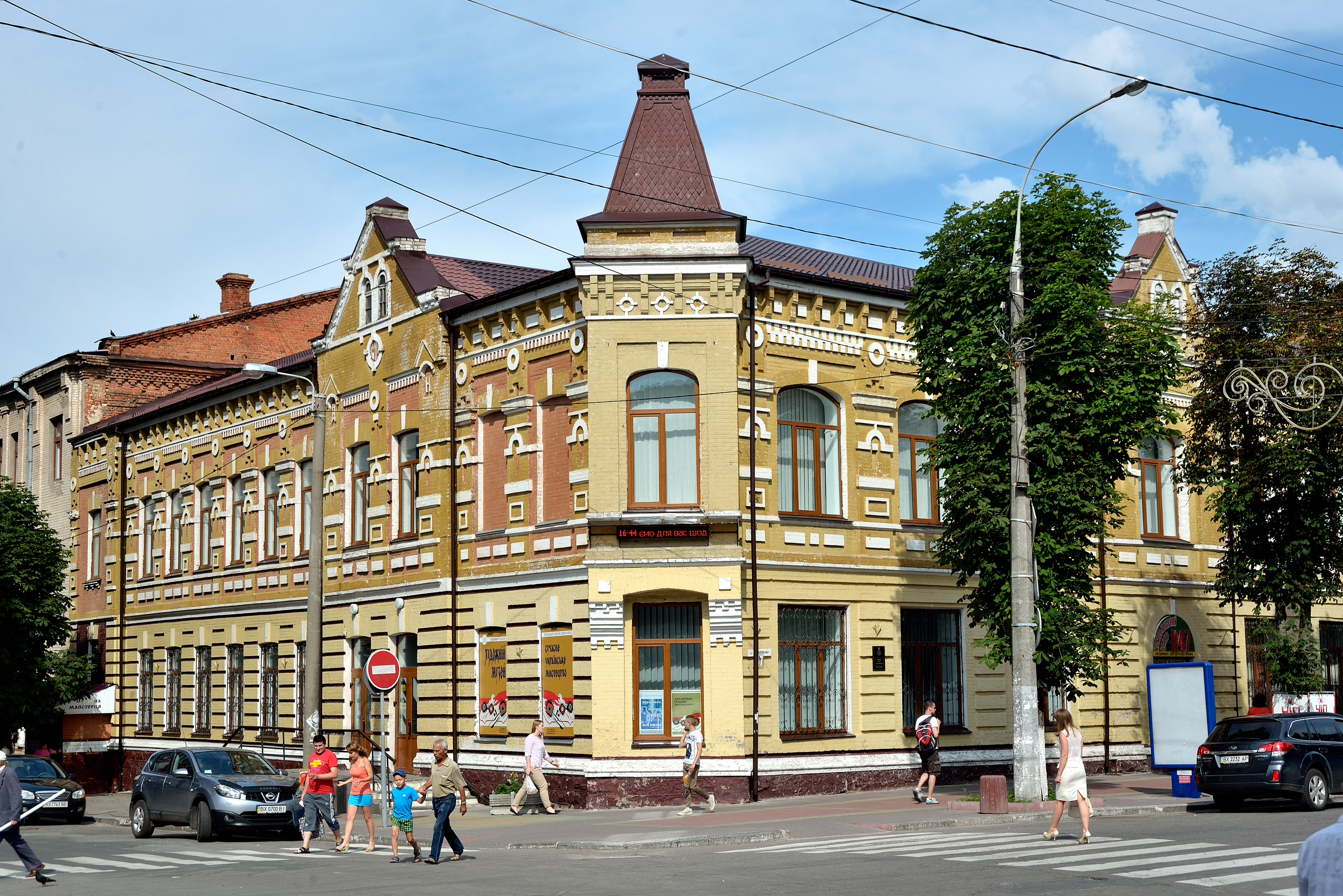
Khmelnytskyi

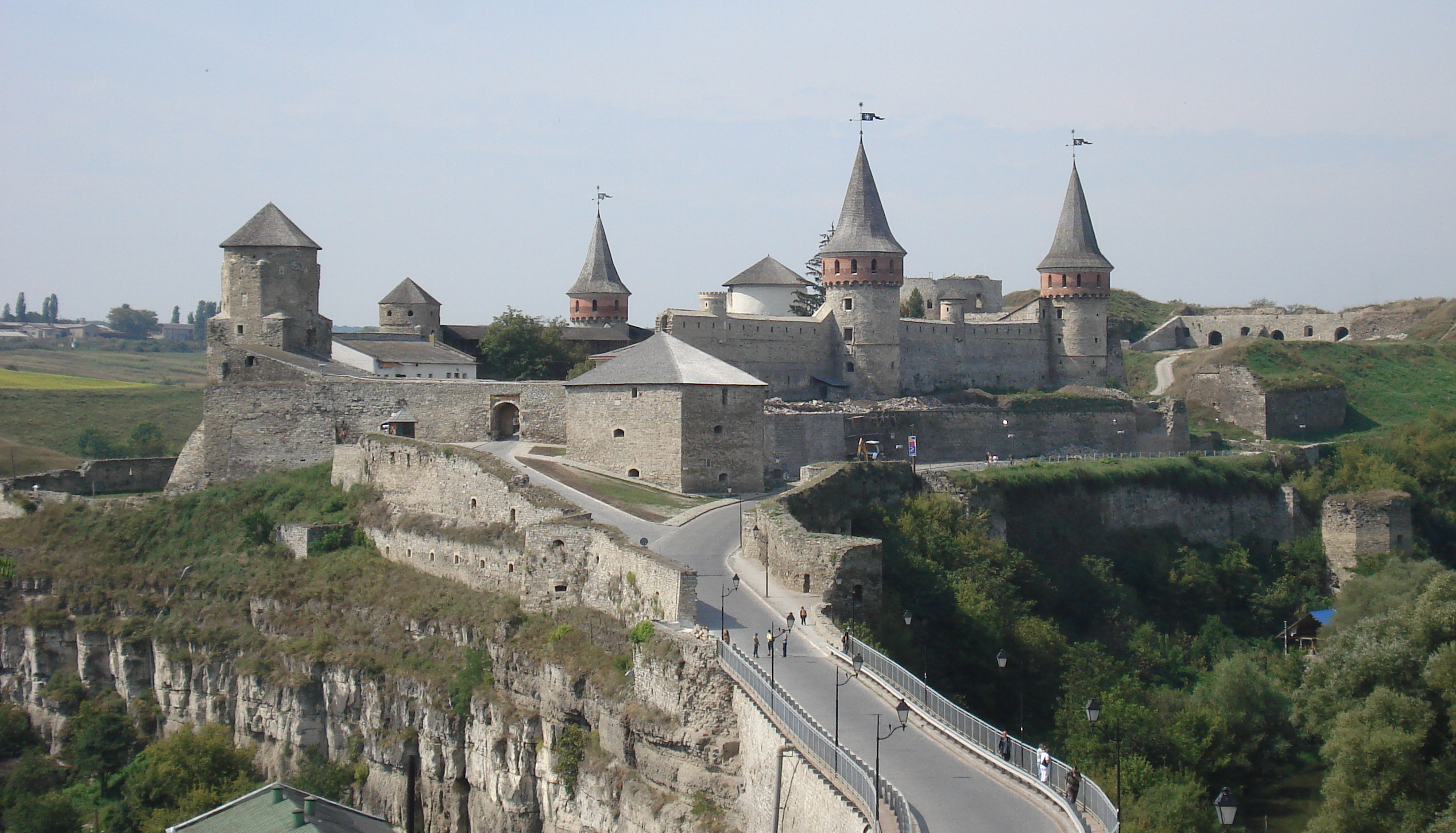
The fortress of Kamianets-Podilskyi

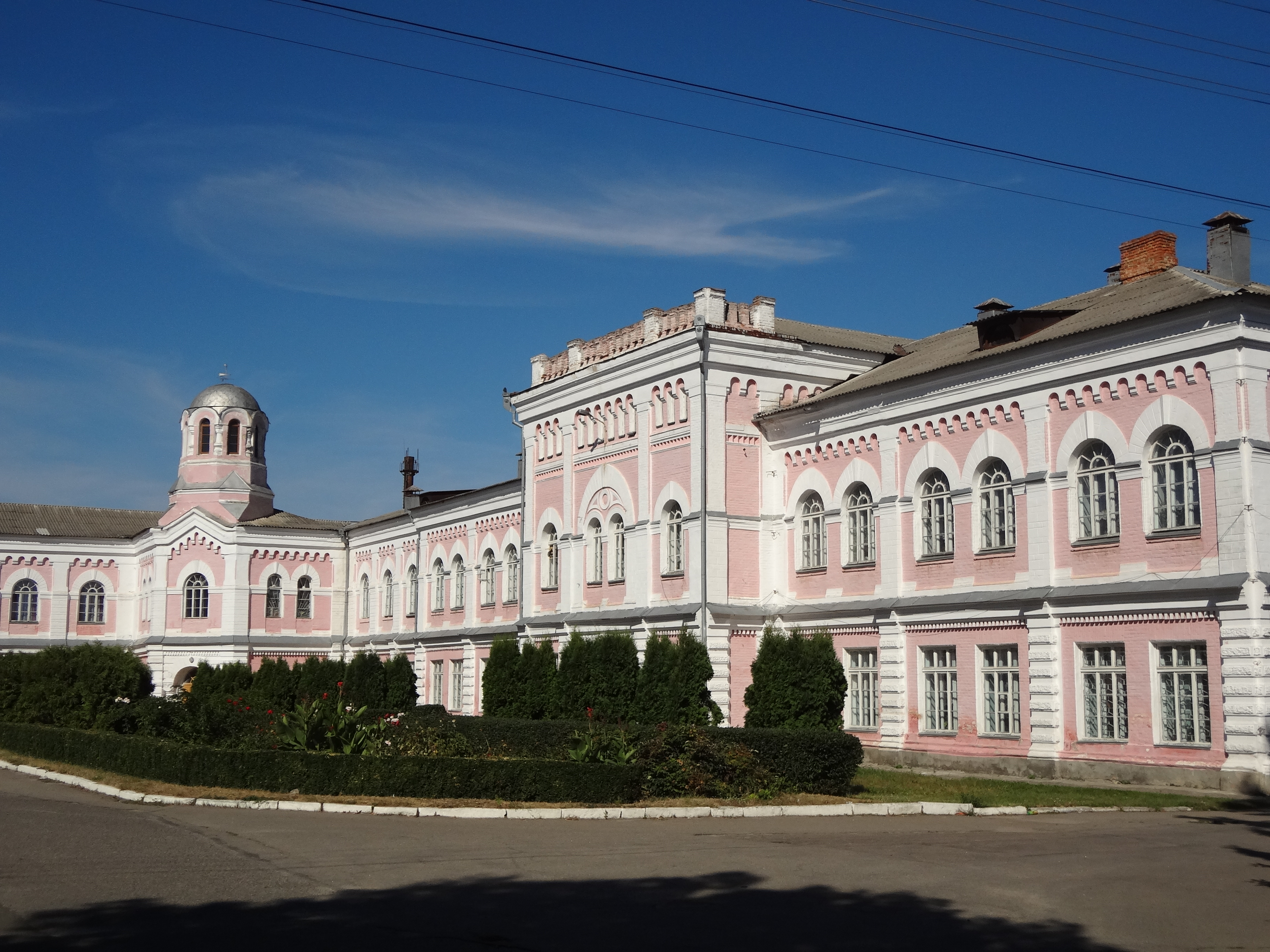
The main building of Uman National University of Horticulture

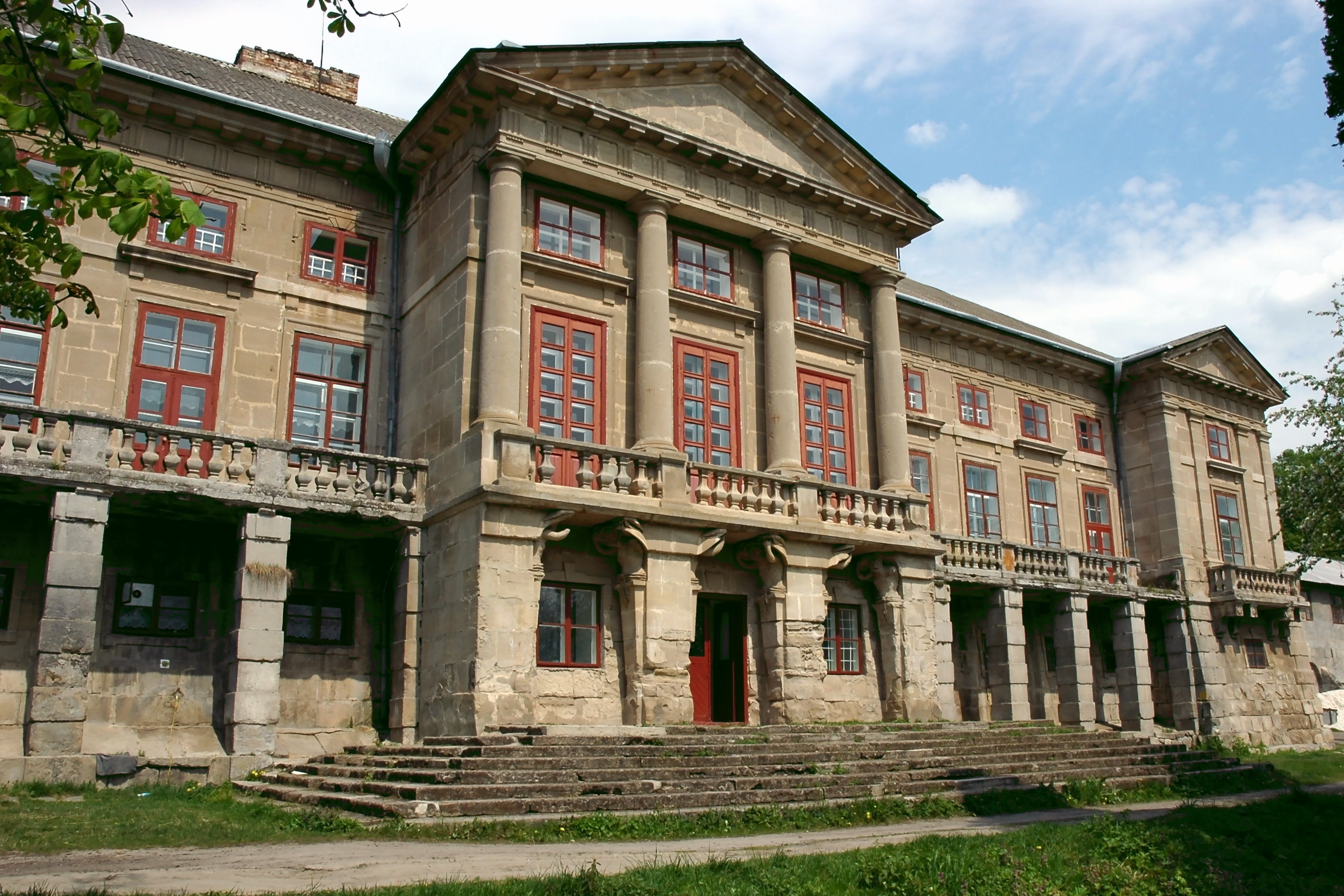
Maliivtsi Palace

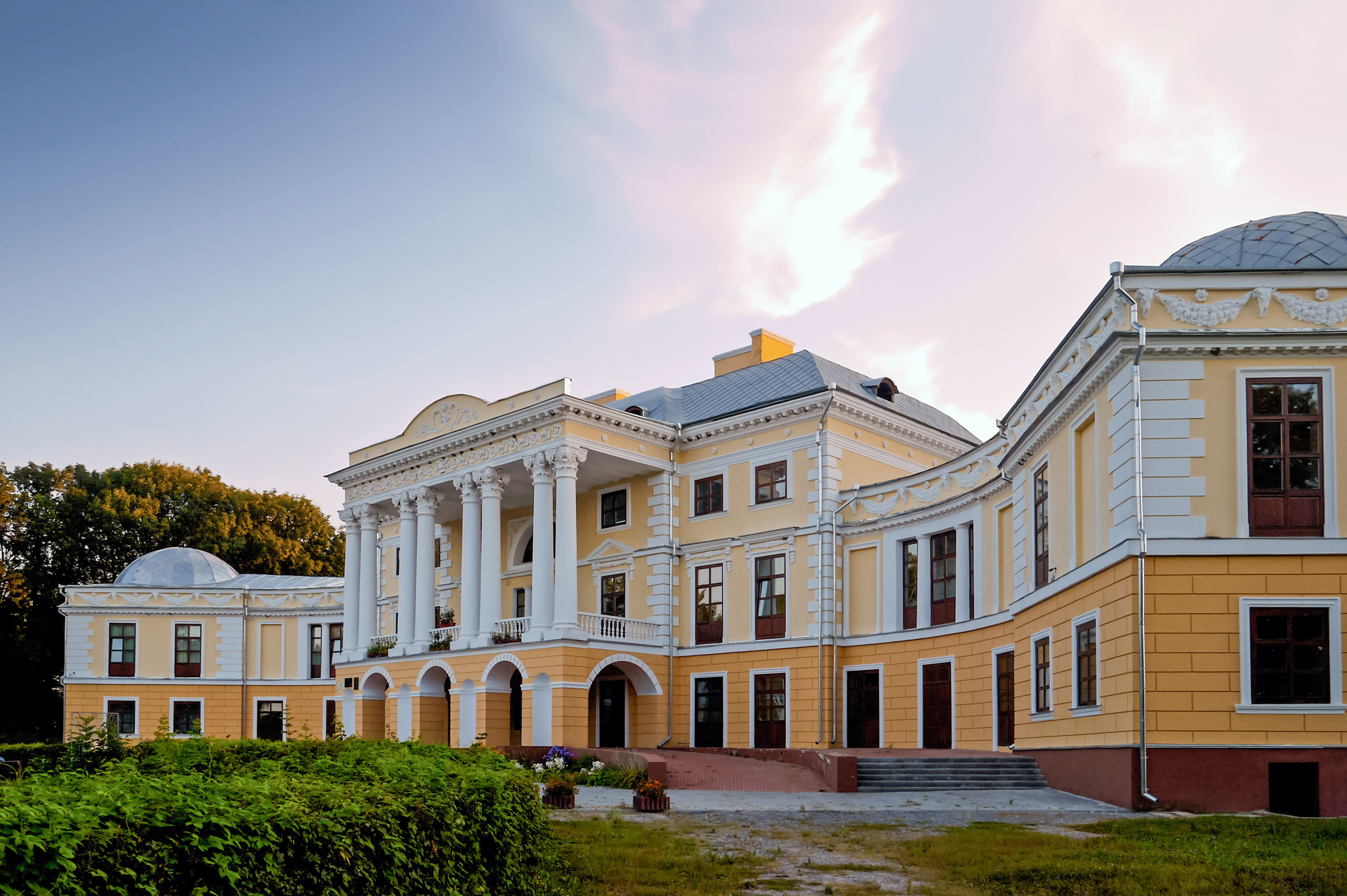
Grocholski Palace in Voronovytsia

Emblem

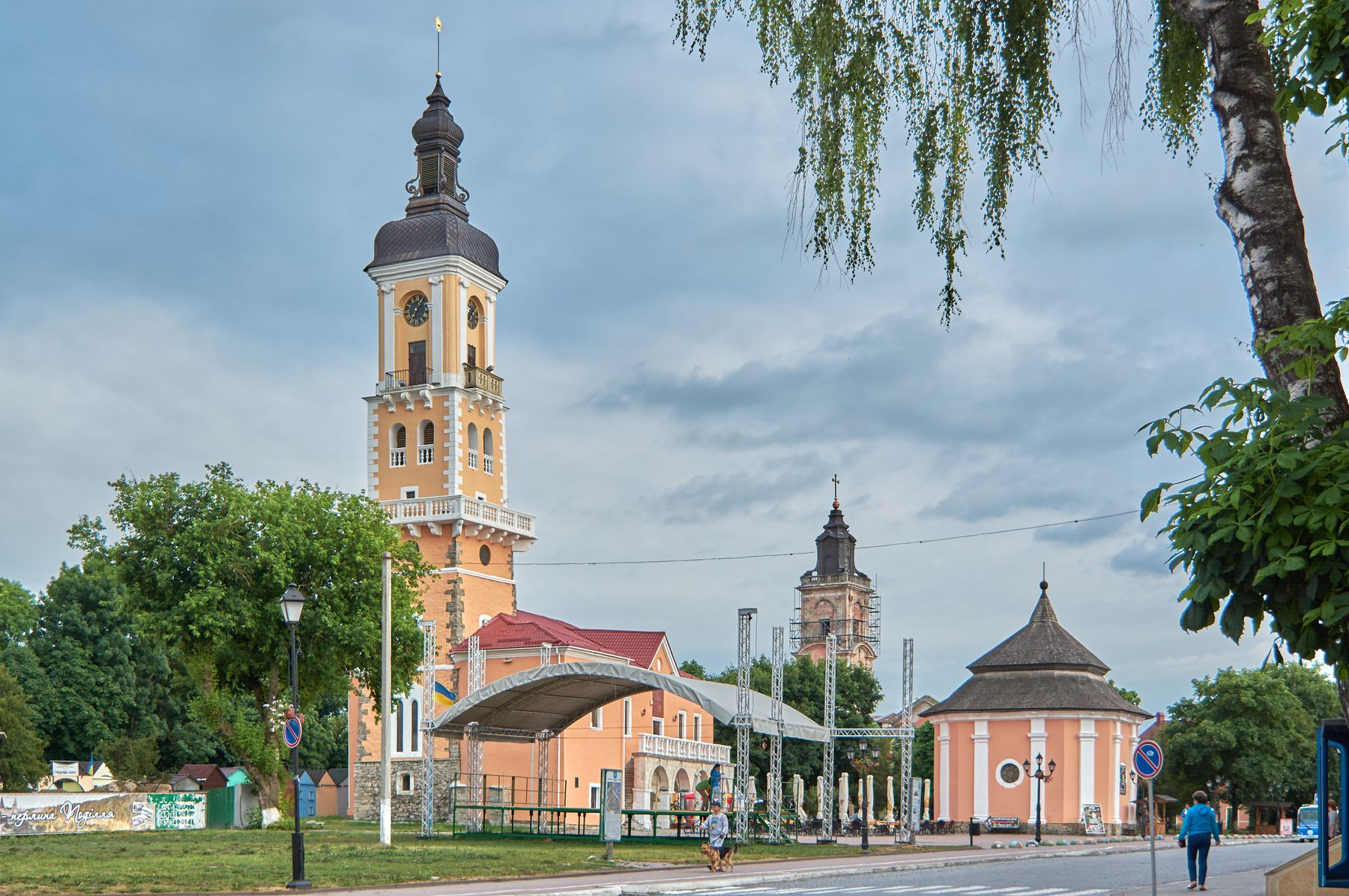
Kamianets-Podilskyi City Hall

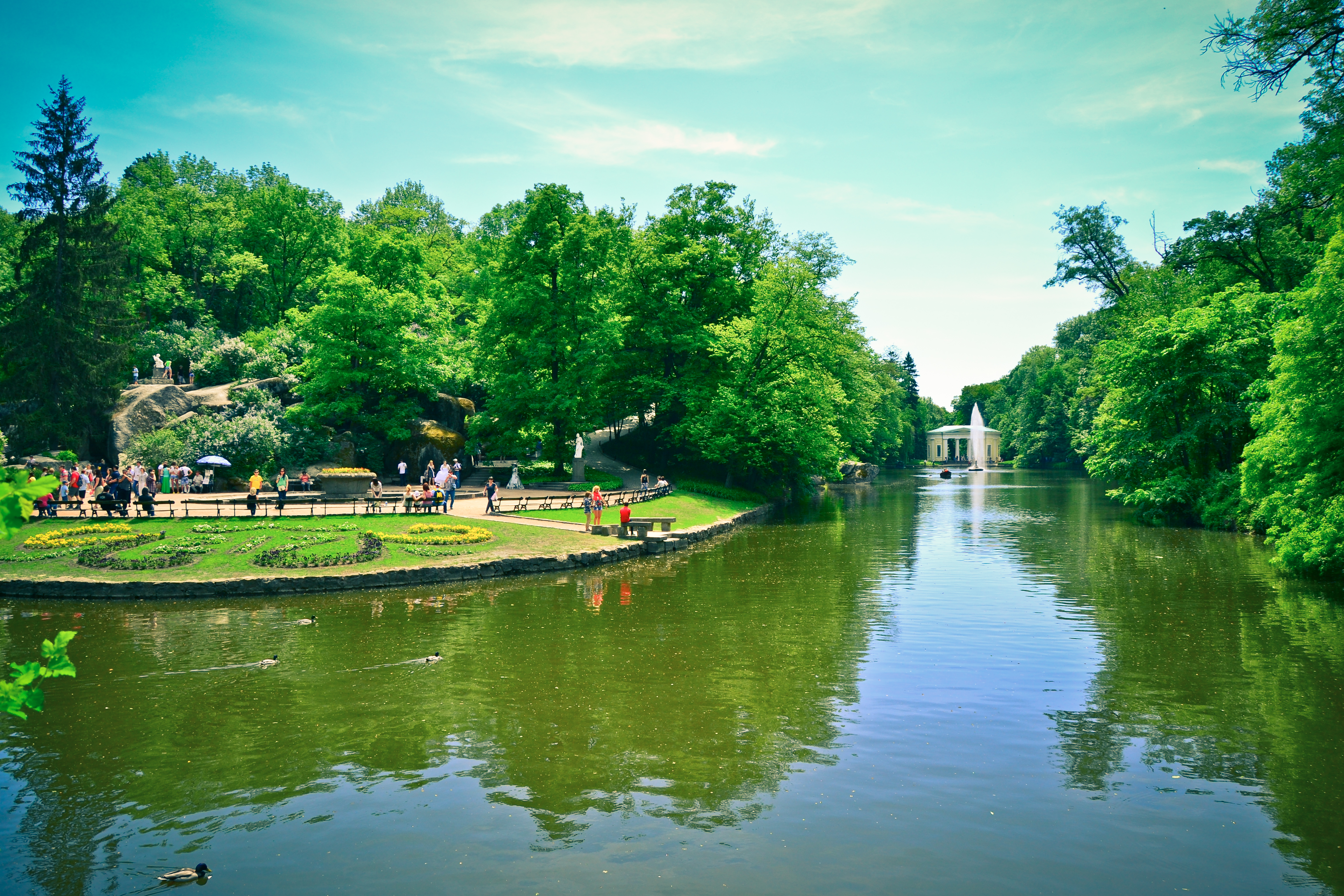
Sofiyivka Park in Uman

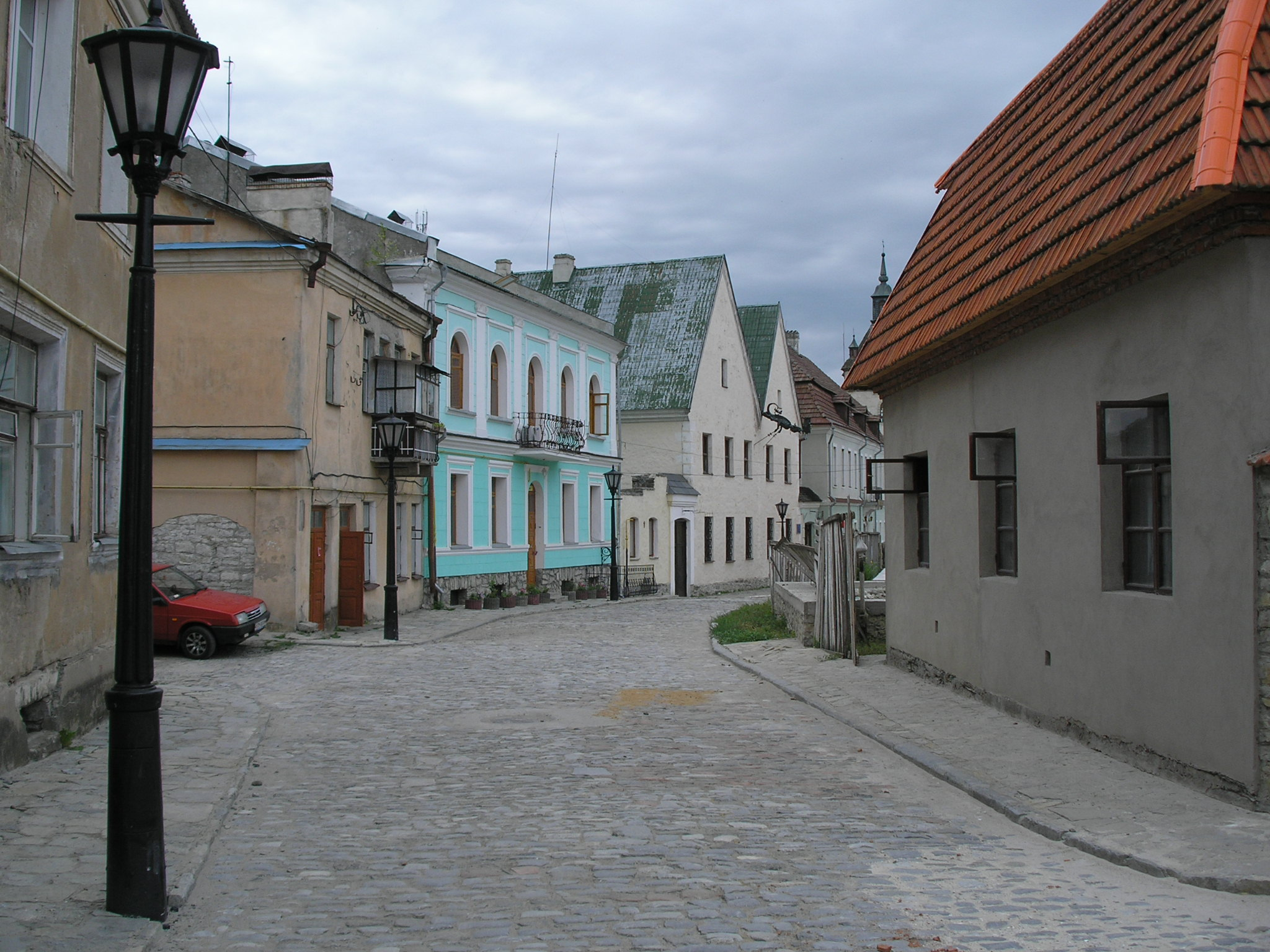
An old street in Kamianets-Podilskyi's old town quarter. Recent restoration works were conducted in the city.

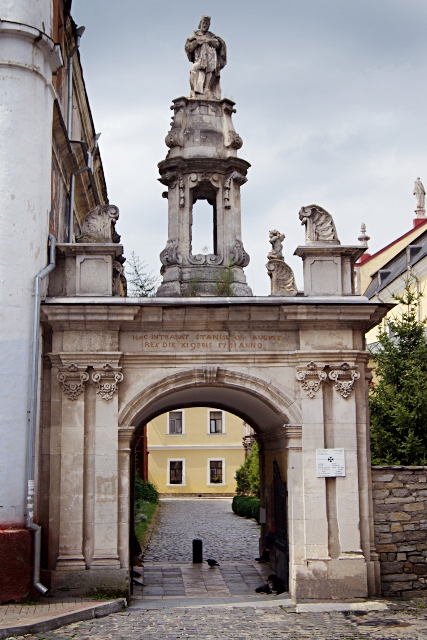
Arch of triumph in Kamianets-Podilskyi

== See also ==
- Podolian dialect

== Bibliography ==
- The Road From Letichev, Chapin & Weinstock, Writers' Showcase 2000
- Plokhy, Serhii (2006). The Origins of the Slavic Nations: Premodern Identities in Russia, Ukraine, and Belarus (PDF). New York: Cambridge University Press. pp. 10–15. ISBN 978-0-521-86403-9. Archived (PDF) from the original on 6 June 2011.
- Tairova-Yakovleva, Tatiana (2020). Ivan Mazepa and the Russian Empire (PDF). Montreal Kingston London Chicago: McGill-Queen's Press. p. 425. ISBN 978-0-2280-0309-0.
- Zhukovsky, Arkadii (1993). "Regimental system". Encyclopedia of Ukraine. Vol. 4. Canadian Institute of Ukrainian Studies.
