= Reniv =

Rural locality in Ternopil Oblast, Ukraine

Reniv Ренів
- Location in Ternopil Oblast
- Coordinates: 49°46′06″N 25°23′23″E
- Country: Ukraine
- Oblast: Ternopil Oblast
- Raion: Ternopil Raion
- Hromada: Zaliztsi settlement hromada
- Time zone: UTC+2 (EET)
  - Summer (DST): UTC+3 (EEST)
- Postal code: 47284

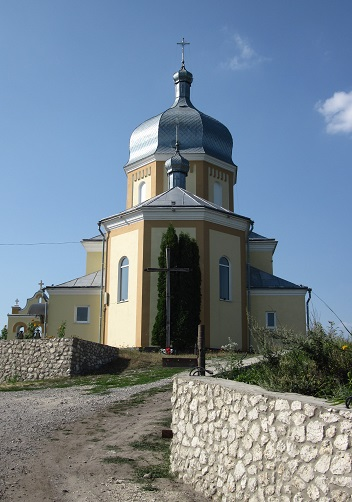
Church of the Transfiguration, built 1899, since been reconstructed.

Reniv (Ukrainian: Ренів) is a village in Zaliztsi settlement hromada, Ternopil Raion, Ternopil Oblast, Ukraine.

== History ==
The first written mention of the village was in 1452.

After the liquidation of the Zboriv Raion on 19 July 2020, the village became part of the Ternopil Raion.

== Religion ==
- Church of the Transfiguration (1899, reconstructed);
- Roman Catholic Church (1908, destroyed in 1915; rebuilt in 1938).

== Sources ==
- (in Ukrainian) Бенцал І., Уніят В., Ренів // Ternopil Encyclopedic Dictionary: in 4 v. / editorial board: H. Yavorskyi and other, Ternopil: "Zbruch", 2008, V. 3: П—Я, S. 175. — ISBN 978-966-528-279-2.
- "Reniów". Geographical Dictionary of the Kingdom of Poland (in Polish). 9. Warszawa: Kasa im. Józefa Mianowskiego. 1888. p. 616.
