= Africae Tabula Nova =

Map of Africa published in 1570

Africae Tabula Nova, 1570

Africae Tabula Nova ("New Map of Africa") is a map of Africa published by Abraham Ortelius in 1570. It was engraved by Frans Hogenberg and included in Ortelius's 1570 atlas Theatrum Orbis Terrarum ("Theater of the World"), commonly regarded as the first modern atlas. The atlas was printed widely in seven languages and 31 total editions between 1570 and 1612.

Africae Tabula Nova is largely based on a wall map published by Giacomo Gastaldi in 1564, while Paolo Forlani's 1562 map of Africa and Gerardus Mercator's 1569 map of the continent were also likely influences on Ortelius. Compared to earlier maps, Ortelius sharpened the shape of Southern Africa in Africae Tabula Nova, shortened the extent of North Africa from west to east, and reduced the eastward extension of Africa, in all cases better depicting reality. The map was also the first to include accurate information from European expeditions into portions of Africa's interior.

Cartographic historian Wulf Bodenstein called Africae Tabula Nova "a cornerstone map that represents a significant improvement over what we have seen so far", while cartographic archivist Ben Huseman notes that the map set "a high standard for European maps of Africa" and influenced later maps of the continent well into the 17th century.

== Background ==
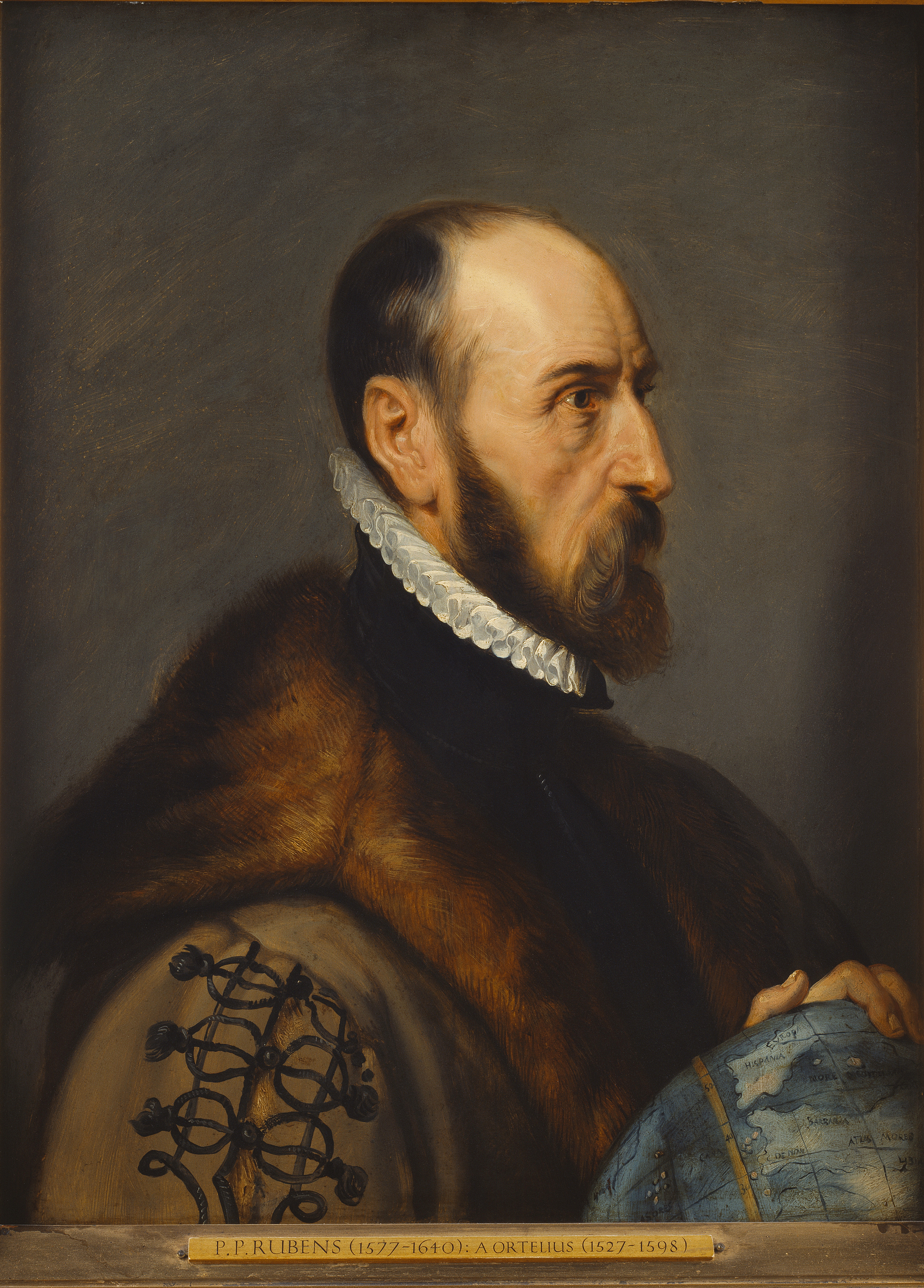
Painting of Abraham Ortelius by Peter Paul Rubens, 1633

The creator of Africae Tabula Nova, Abraham Ortelius, was born in Antwerp in 1527. After studying mathematics and the classics, he began his career as a map colorist at age 20. Following the death of his father, he began trading in maps, which led him to Frankfurt and other larger cities and exposed him to the highest-quality foreign maps, which inspired him to publish an atlas of his own.

By the time Africae Tabula Nova was published in 1570, the coasts of the continent had already been well surveyed. European expeditions to Abyssinia, the Congo River, West Africa, and the Zambezi had also yielded information about some portions of Africa's interior. Africae Tabula Nova was the first map of Africa to include accurate information from these expeditions.

== Publication ==
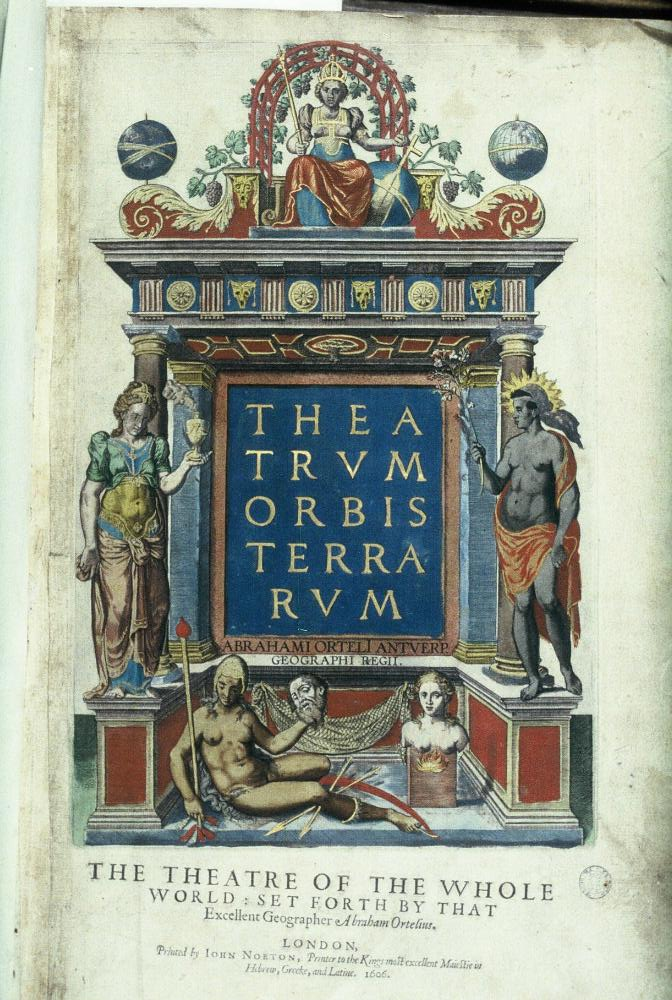
Title page from a 1606 edition of Theatrum Orbis Terrarum

Africae Tabula Nova was published in Antwerp by Abraham Ortelius in 1570. The map's title translates to "New Map of Africa" in English. It was engraved by Frans Hogenberg, who went on to author the Civitates Orbis Terrarum in 1572.

The map was published in Ortelius's 1570 atlas Theatrum Orbis Terrarum ("Theater of the World"), commonly regarded as the first modern atlas and also notable for its substantial coverage of Africa, including multiple African regional maps in addition to the Africae Tabula Nova. Taking ten years to complete, Theatrum Orbis Terrarum was the first atlas to intentionally include a uniform series of maps. The atlas was printed widely in seven languages: Dutch, English, French, German, Italian, Latin, and Spanish. It necessitated four separate printings in 1570 alone, and in total 31 different editions of the atlas were published between 1570 and 1612. The atlas was first printed by Gielis Coppens van Diest from 1570 to 1573, with Ortelius paying. Starting in 1579, the Theatrum Orbis Terrarum was printed by Christopher Plantin.

== Description ==
Africae Tabula Nova is largely based on a wall map published by Giacomo Gastaldi in Venice in 1564. Paolo Forlani's 1562 map of Africa and Gerardus Mercator's 1569 map of the continent were also likely influences on Ortelius. Africae Tabula Nova depicts the Nile emanating from two unnamed side-by-side lakes, in line with Ptolemaic understanding; a western lake as the headwaters of the Zaire River; and the Niger River passing underground for about 60 miles (97 km), in accordance with a Latin legend. The underground passage of the Niger was included on every major subsequent map of Africa, with the exception of Mercator's map, until the late 17th century. Ortelius's map is also notable for placing Zanzibar in southwestern Africa, on the Atlantic coast of southern Africa. Ortelius himself noted that it was "unknown to the ancients" and relied upon Arab and Persian authors for information. Scholars have hypothesized that this apparent error may have been because of a lack of space further east on the map. Map collector Oscar I. Norwich observes that "Zanzibar" was, at the time, often used as a name for the East African coast north of Cape Delgado. Africae Tabula Nova includes correctly located toponyms that are still in current use, such as Benin, the Congo, and Mozambique. Ortelius also notably excluded the legendary "Mountains of the Moon" from his map, which were prominently included on most earlier maps of Africa, likely because he followed Gastaldi closely and Gastaldi did not include them in his 1564 map.

Compared to earlier maps, Ortelius sharpened the shape of Southern Africa, particularly the Cape of Good Hope, in Africae Tabula Nova and also shortened the extent of North Africa from west to east, better depicting reality. He reduced the eastward extension of Africa by about 1,700 kilometres (1,100 mi), to 7,000 kilometres (4,300 mi), closer to the actual measurement of about 6,800 kilometres (4,200 mi). He also reduced the distance from Ceuta to Cairo by about 1,600 kilometres (990 mi), to 3,500 kilometres (2,200 mi), again approaching closer to the actual measurement, 3,450 kilometres (2,140 mi). The map illustrates lakes, rivers, and cities throughout the continent, but does not depict animals on land.

Africae Tabula Nova is illustrated with two narwhals or swordfish, a sea monster, and a cartouche created in a Mannerist style that is flanked by two female figures. The map also includes a sea battle in the lower right corner that was copied and reversed from Diego Gutiérrez's 1562 wall map of the Americas. Compared to Gastaldi's map, Oretelius was much more sparse in terms of ornamentation. For example, he only included three sea creatures on his map, as opposed to 20 on Gastaldi's map. A "ghost sea monster" is also visible east of the Arabian Peninsula on early editions of Africae Tabula Nova, although it disappears after 1584.

On the reverse of the map, Ortelius included annotations about African geography, the etymology of Africa, and the pigmentation of African peoples, quoting authors such as Herodotus, Leo Africanus, Ptolemy, and Vasco da Gama. The inclusion of such sources on a map was unusual at the time.

== Legacy ==
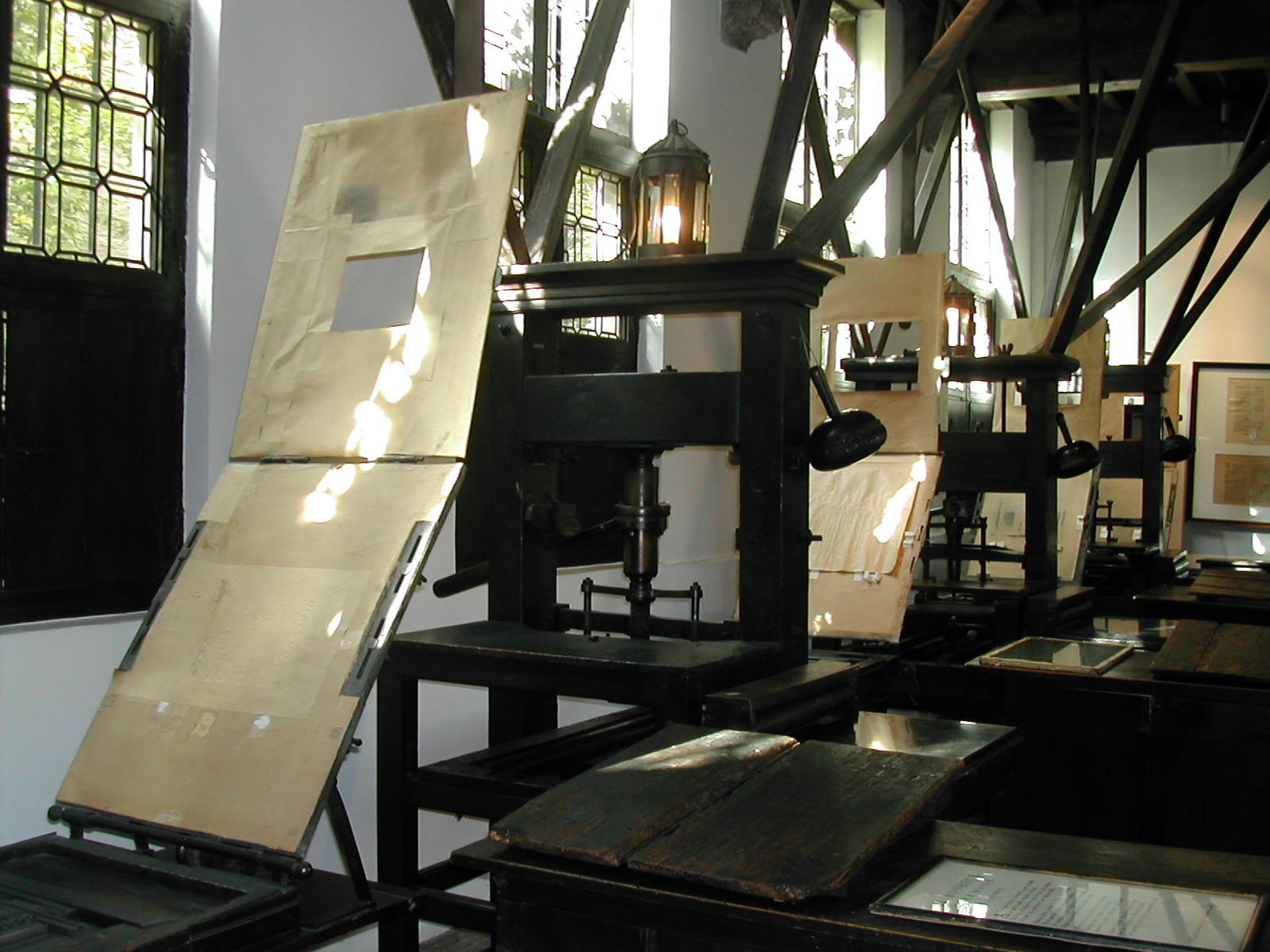
Original printing presses at the Plantin-Moretus Museum, 2014

In the estimation of cartographic historian Wulf Bodenstein, Africae Tabula Nova is "a cornerstone map that represents a significant improvement over what we have seen so far, although much of the geography of the interior is still mere speculation." Cartographic archivist Ben Huseman notes that the map set "a high standard for European maps of Africa", effectively succeeding Sebastian Münster's 1540 map of Africa and influencing later maps of the continent well into the 17th century. Norwich credited Ortelius "for the first systematic collection of uniform-sized maps of all parts of the world". Specifically discussing Africae Tabula Nova, he conceded that while it did have a few mistakes, it is "one of the cornerstones of map making of the continent of Africa" and was "the standard map for the rest of the sixteenth century".

The printing offices where the map was produced at what is now the Plantin-Moretus Museum in Antwerp are open to the public.
