= Theatrum Orbis Terrarum =

1570 atlas by Abraham Ortelius

- In 1570 (May 20) Gilles Coppens de Diest at Antwerp published 53 maps created by Abraham Ortelius under the title Theatrum Orbis Terrarum, considered the "first modern atlas". (Note: The first work that contained systematically arranged maps of uniform size, intended to be published in a book, thus representing the first modern atlas, was De Summa totius Orbis (1524–26) by the 16th-century Italian cartographer Pietro Coppo. Nonetheless, this distinction is conventionally awarded to Abraham Ortelius's Theatrum Orbis Terrarum.) Three Latin editions of this (besides a Dutch, a French and a German edition) appeared before the end of 1572; twenty-five editions came out before Ortelius' death in 1598; and several others were published subsequently, for the atlas continued to be in demand till about 1612. This is the world map from this atlas.
- Author: Abraham Ortelius
- Genre: Atlas
- Publisher: Gilles Coppens de Diest
- Publication date: 1570; 456 years ago

Theatrum Orbis Terrarum (Latin: [tʰɛˈaː.tɾũː ˈɔɾ.bɪs tɛrˈraː.ɾũː], "Theatre of the Lands of the World") is considered to be the first true modern atlas. Written by Abraham Ortelius, strongly encouraged by Gillis Hooftman and originally printed on 20 May 1570 in Antwerp, it consisted of a collection of uniform map sheets and supporting text bound to form a book for which copper printing plates were specifically engraved. The Ortelius atlas is sometimes referred to as the summary of sixteenth-century cartography. The publication of the Theatrum Orbis Terrarum (1570) is often considered the official beginning of the Golden Age of Netherlandish cartography (approximately 1570s–1670s). (Note: Sometimes known as the Golden Age of Dutch cartography.)

== Contents ==
The atlas contained virtually no maps from the hand of Ortelius, but 53 bundled maps of other masters, with the source as indicated. Previously, groupings of disparate maps were only released as custom lots, to individual order. In the Ortelius atlas, however, the maps were all in the same style and of the same size, printed from copper plates, logically arranged by continent, region and state. In addition to the maps he provided a descriptive comment and referrals on the reverse. This was the first time that the entirety of Western European knowledge of the world was brought together in one book.

In the bibliography, in the section 'Catalogus Auctorum', not only were the 33 cartographers mentioned whose work was recorded in the Theatrum (which at the time was not yet customary), but also the total of 87 cartographers of the 16th century that Ortelius knew. This list grew in every Latin Edition, and included no less than 183 names in 1601. Among the sources the following are mentioned: for the world map, the World Map (1561) by Giacomo Gastaldi; the porto Avenue of the Atlantic coast (1562) by Diego Gutierrez, the world map (1569) of Gerardus Mercator, which have eight maps derived from the Theatrum.

For the map of Europe, wall map (1554). of the Mercator map of Scandinavia (1539) by Olaus Magnus, map of Asia was derived from his own Asia-map from 1567, which in turn was inspired by that of Gastaldi (1559). Also for the Africa map he referred to Gastaldi.

This work by Ortelius, consisted of a collection of the best maps, refined by himself, combined into one map or split across multiple, and on the same size (folios of approximately 35 x 50 cm). The naming and location coordinates were not normalized.

== Editions ==
After the initial publication of Theatrum Orbis Terrarum, Ortelius regularly revised and expanded the atlas, reissuing it in various formats until his death in 1598. From its original seventy maps and eighty-seven bibliographic references in the first edition (1570), the atlas grew through its thirty-one editions to encompass 183 references and 167 maps in 1612.

The online copy of the 1573 volume held by the State Library of New South Wales contains 70 numbered double-page sheets, tipped onto stubs at the centerfold, with six maps combined with descriptive letterpress on the recto of each first leaf. The legends of most maps name the author whose map Ortelius adapted. In the preface Ortelius credits Franciscus Hogenberg with engraving nearly all the maps.

The 1573 Additamentum to the atlas is notable for containing Humphrey Llwyd's Cambriae Typus, the first map to show Wales on its own.

Theatrum Orbis Terrarum is used as the centerpiece of the Fool's Cap Map of the World, which is a satirical presentation of Europe's understanding of the globe.

From the 1630s, the Blaeu family issued their work under a similar title, Theatrum orbis terrarum, sive, Atlas Novus.

== Structure ==
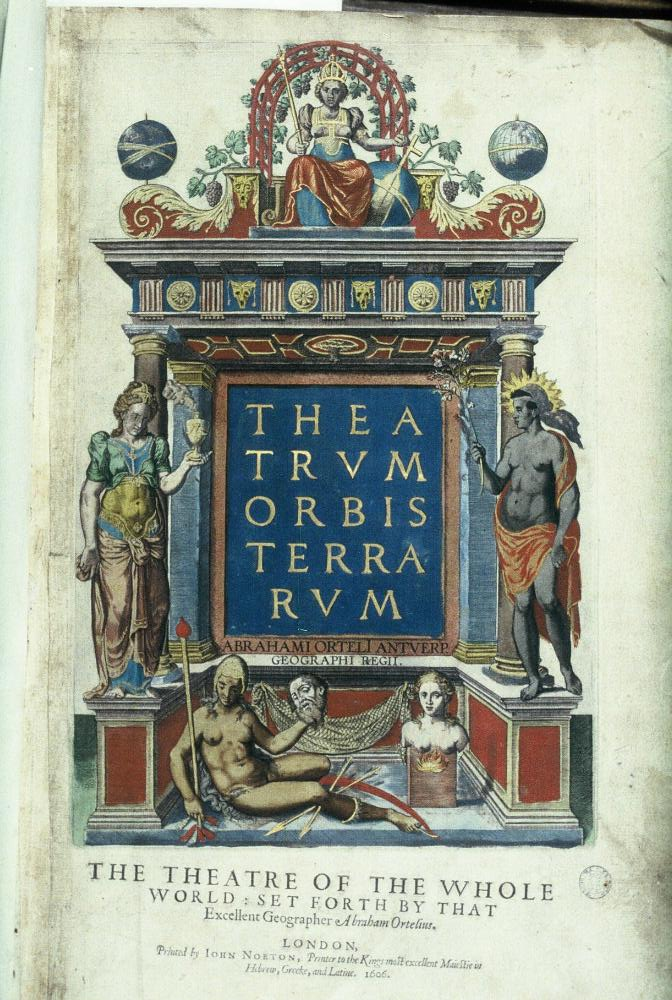
Title page from a 1606 edition with female figures representing the continents

All the editions had the same structure. They started with an allegorical title page, on which the five known continents were presented by allegorical women, with Europe as the Queen. Then a reference to Philip II, King of Spain and the Low Countries, and a poem by Adolphus Mekerchus (Adolf of Meetkercke). From 1579, the editions contain a portrait of Ortelius by Philip Galle, an introduction by Ortelius, in the Latin editions followed by a recommendation by Mercator. This is followed by the bibliography (Catalogus Auctorum), an index (Index Tabularum), the maps with text on the back, followed (starting from 1579 in the Latin editions) by a register of place names in ancient times (Nomenclator), the treatise, the Mona Druidum insula of the Welsh scientist Humphrey Lhuyd (Humphrey Llwyd) over the Anglesey coat of arms, and finally the 'privilege' and a colophon.

== Cost ==
The moneyed middle class, which had much interest in knowledge and science, turned out to be very much interested in the convenient size and the pooling of knowledge. For buyers who were not strong in Latin, from the end of 1572, in addition to the Latin version, Dutch, German and French editions were published. This rapid success prompted the Ortelius Theatrum to constantly expand and improve. In 1573, he released 17 more additional maps under the title Additamentum Theatri Orbis Terrarum, bringing the total at 70 maps. By Ortelius' death in 1598, there were twenty-five editions that had appeared in seven different languages.

== Image gallery ==
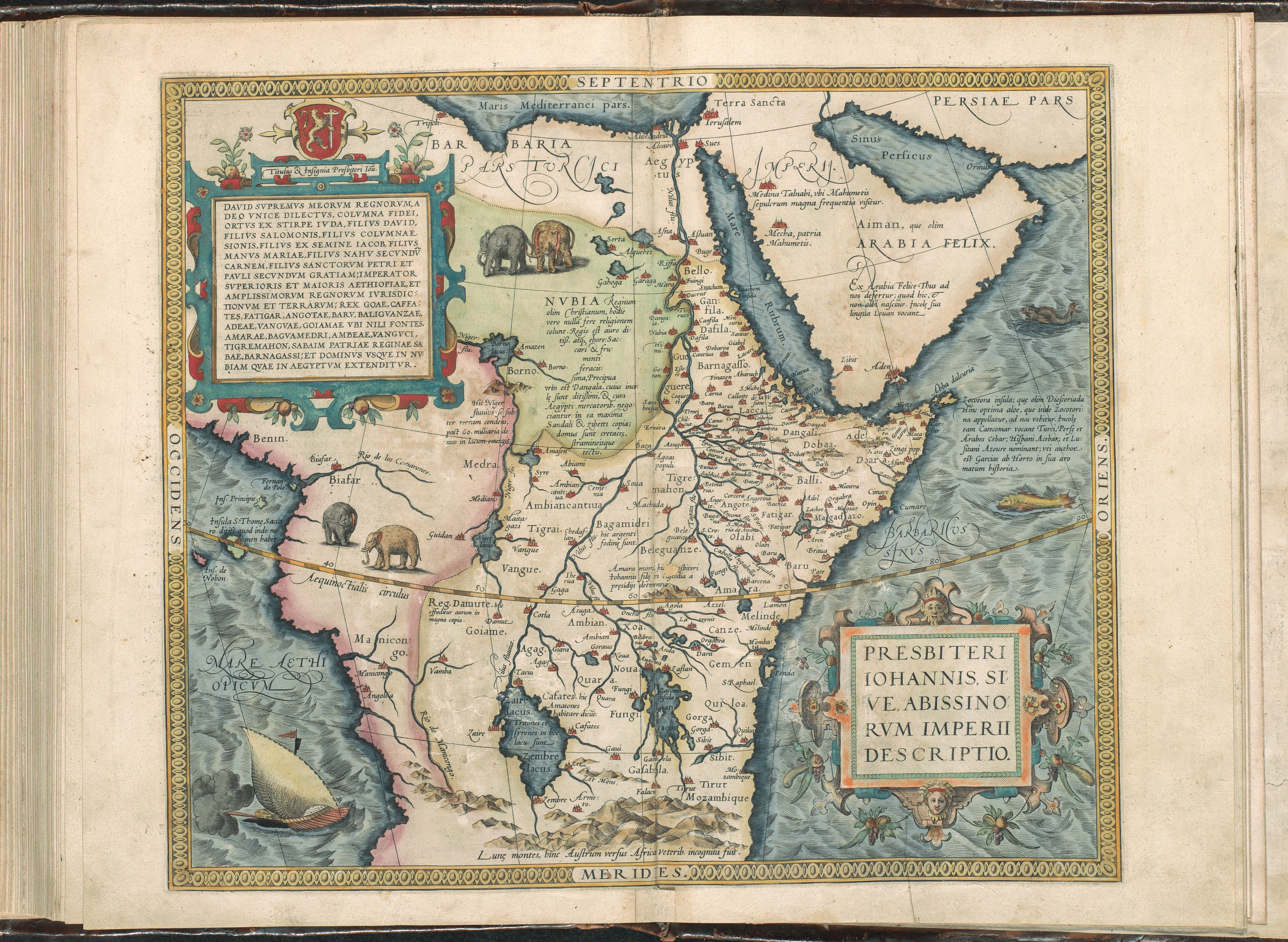
Africa and the Arabian Peninsula

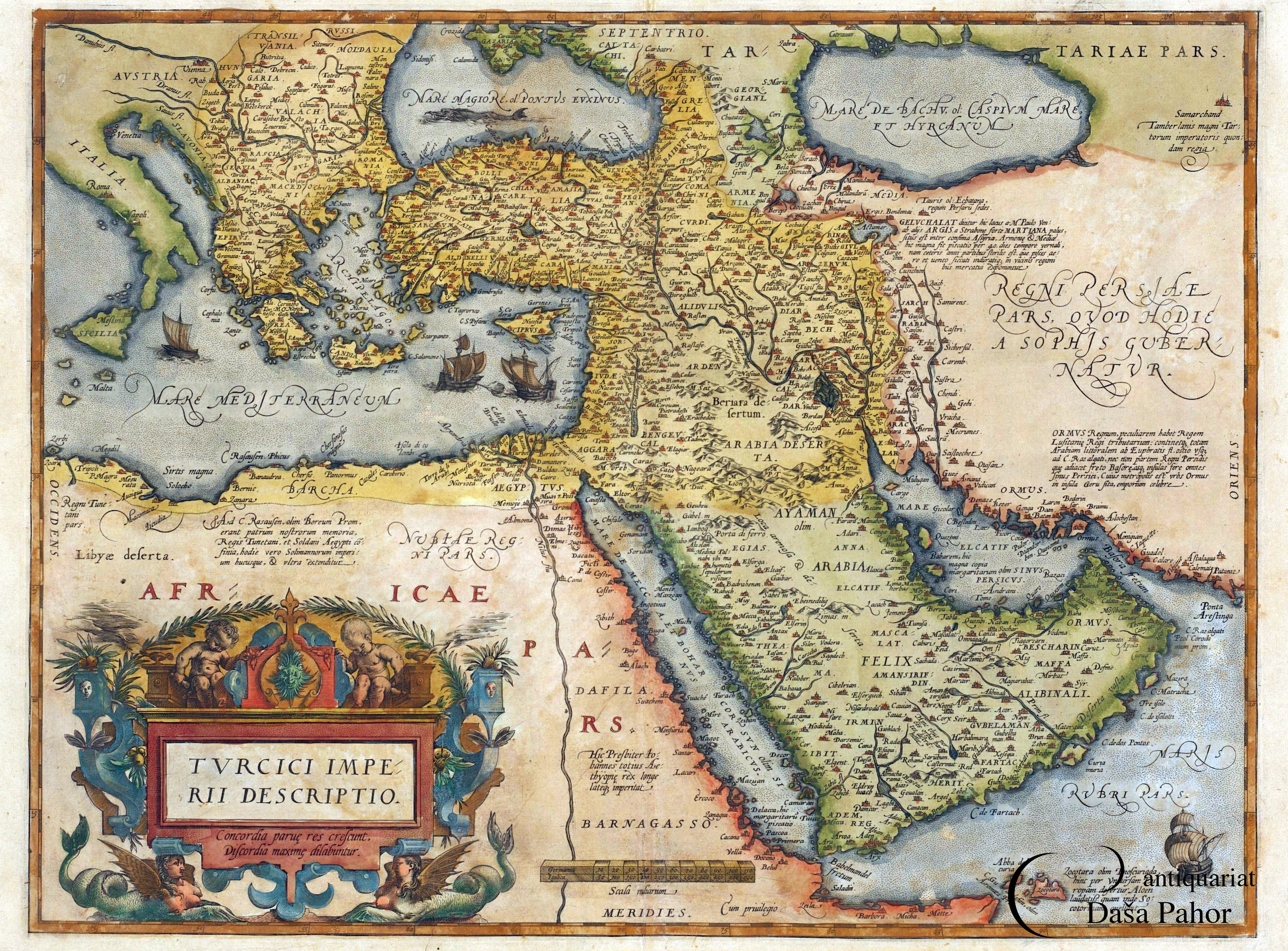
Turkish Empire

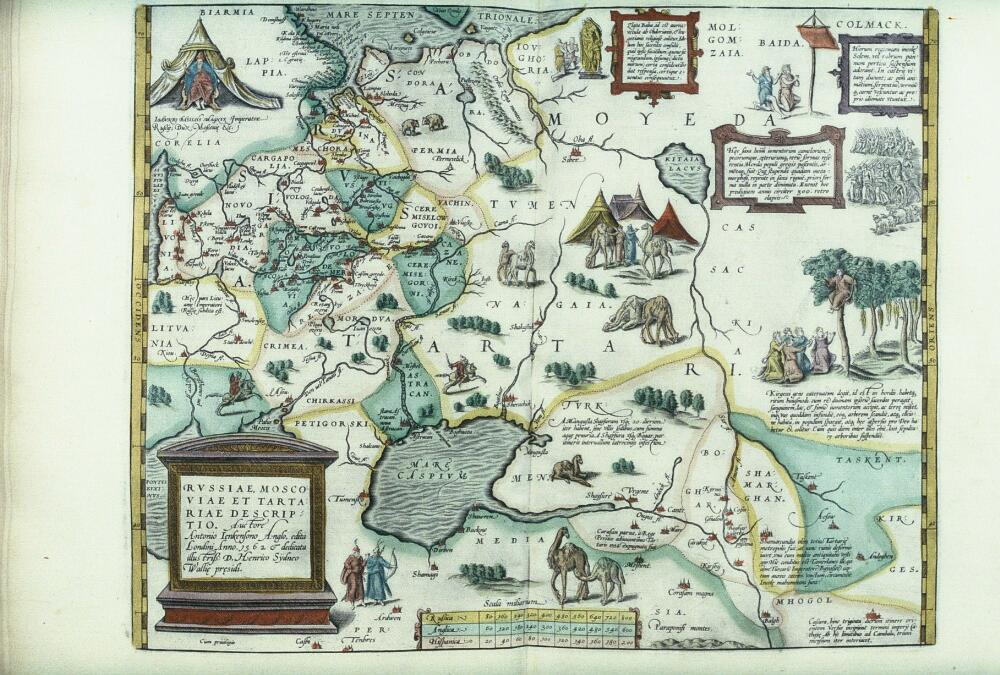
Russia and Tartary

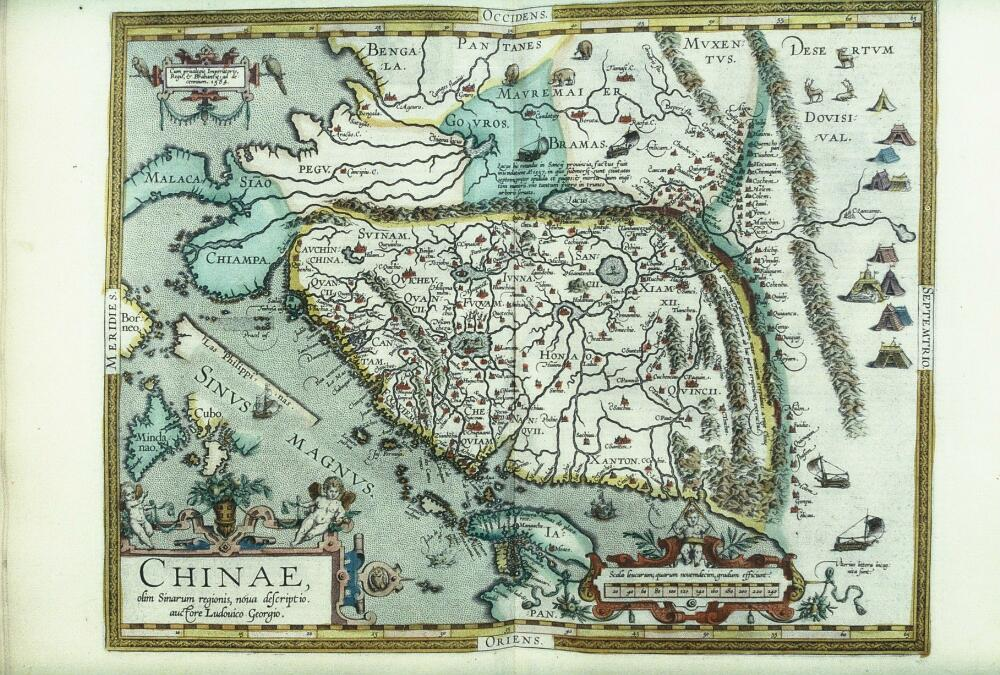
China and South East Asia, with West at the top

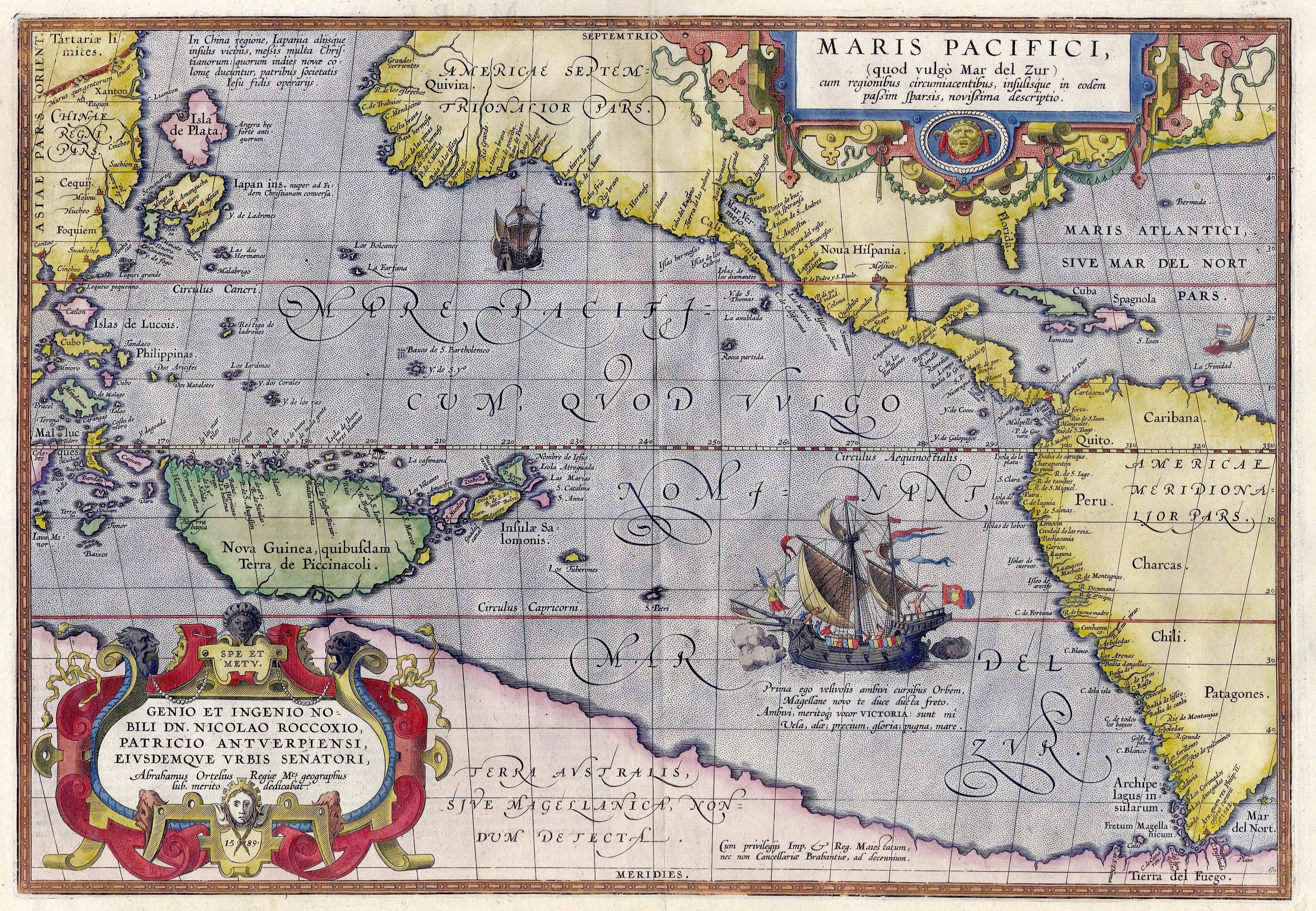
Maris Pacifici including Terra Australis

Poland and Lithuania

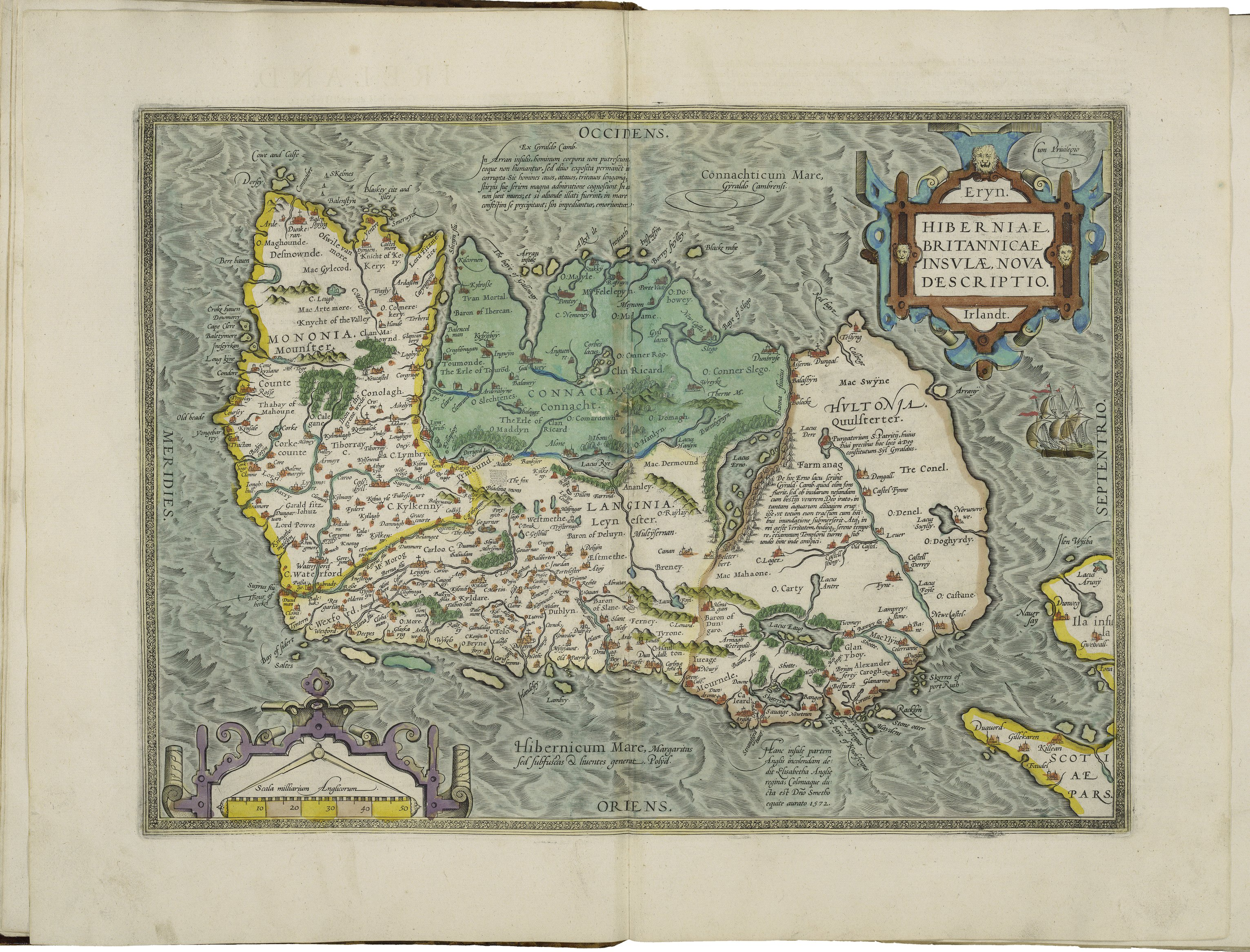
Hibernia

== See also ==
- Maris Pacifici
- Early world maps
- History of cartography
- List of geographers
- Mappa Mundi
- Here be dragons
- Terra incognita
- Golden Age of Netherlandish cartography (also known as the Golden Age of Dutch and Flemish cartography)
