= Cambriae Typus =

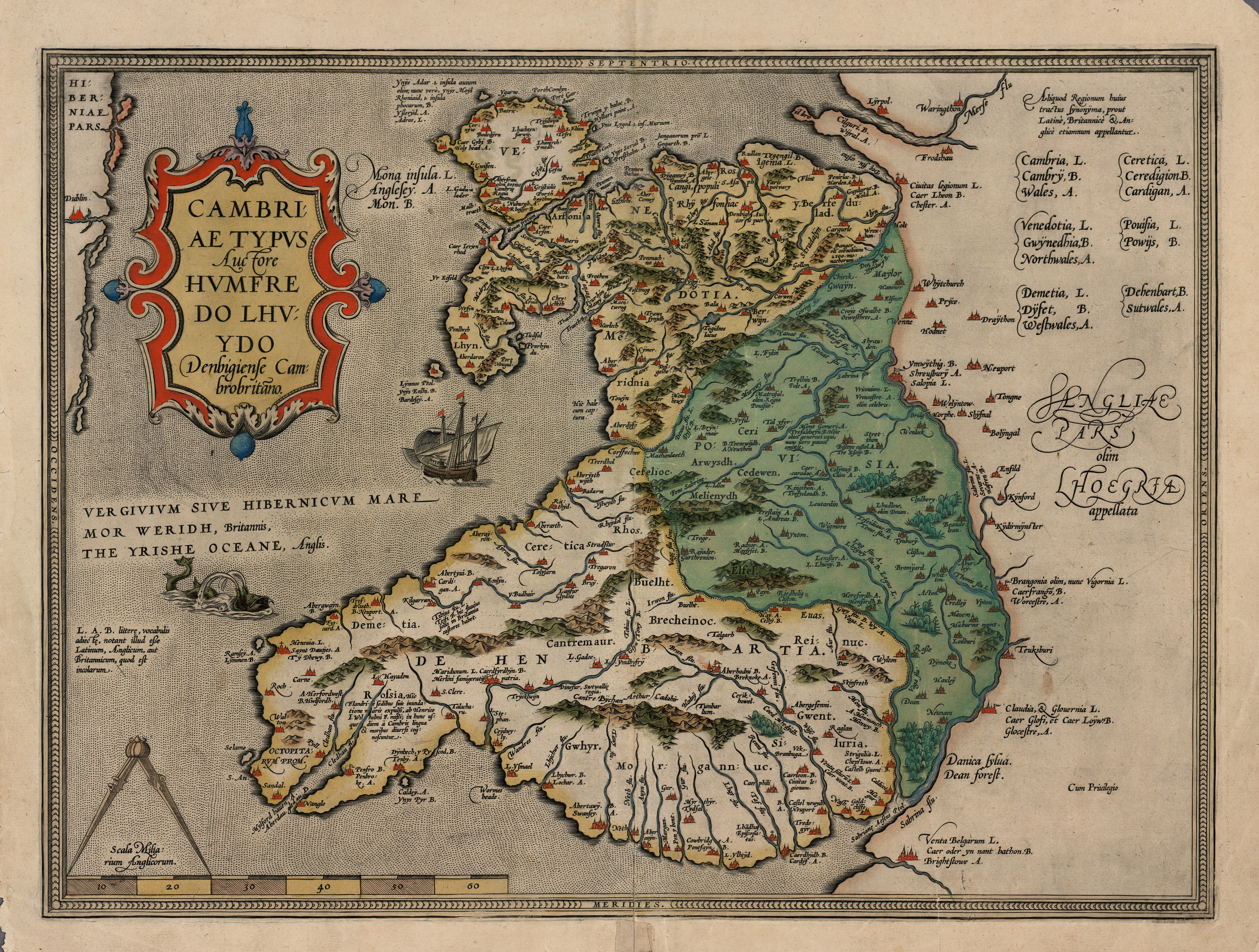
A 1574 version of Humphrey Llwyd's 1573 map of Wales, Cambriae Typus

Cambriae Typus, the "model image of Wales", is the earliest published map of Wales as a separate country from the rest of Great Britain. Made by Elizabethan polymath Humphrey Llwyd in 1573, the map shows Wales stretching to the River Severn, including large areas of what is now England.

== Publication ==
Humphrey Llwyd (1527–1568), a Welsh historian, physician and politician, though not a professional surveyor, began work on the Cambriae Typus late in his life. In a letter shortly before his death he sent the manuscript of the map to Abraham Ortelius, who published it in the 1573 Additamentum to the 1570 publication of Theatrum Orbis Terrarum. The map was titled Cambriae Typus. The map of Wales appeared alongside a joint map of Wales and England, also by Llwyd. Cambriae Typus was subsequently revised and used in the Mercator atlas of 1607 and in later atlases.

== Specifications ==
The original four-sheet manuscript of the map has now been lost, but original prints from Theatrum Orbis Terrarum still survive. Although often described as a 1573 publication, the National Library of Wales, which owns an original print of the map, place a tentative date of 1574 to the work. The original print of the map was 47.2 by 34.7 cm, using Ortelius typeface. The scale was set at ca.1:520,000.

== Features ==
Cambriae Typus is the first printed map to show Wales as a separate country. The map itself is a weak representation of the country, even for its time, with multiple inaccuracies that did not exist in contemporary maps. It has been suggested that the poor delineation of the coastline may be due to a mistake made by Ortelius in transferring the original or that Llwyd had based the original on an earlier inaccurate map.

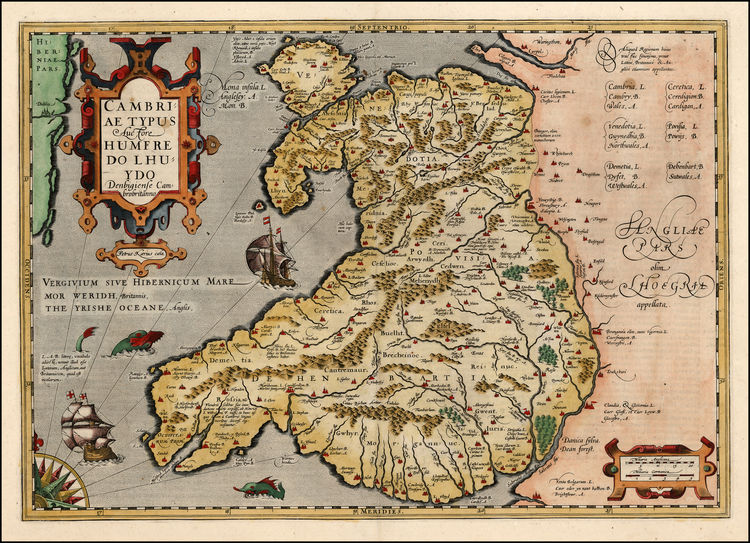
1606 version, edited by Peter Kaerius.

Location names on the front of the map are given in Latin, English and Welsh, while the back side contains the equivalent text in German. Various features depicted on the map include a divider caliper in the lower left-hand corner, a cartouche, a sailing ship in Cardigan Bay, as well as a sea monster in the Irish Sea off the coast of Pembrokeshire. The map has a decorative border.

In total five revisions were made to Llwyd's map, including a copper etching by Peter Kaerius, published by Jodocus Hondius in 1603. This version retained the original features of the map, but the additional graphics were changed. In the 1603 print the dividers were replaced by a quarter compass radiating lines out across the Irish Sea, the cartouche was enlarged; while the original ship and seas monster were removed and replaced by two different versions of each. A 1612 version had a stronger more defined coastal outline based on the original, with a further edition using the same improved coastal outline on Hondius' map.

The map shows Wales stretching to the River Severn, land which is now part of England. This was because Llwyd was making a cultural and historical map, rather than one that showed the political situation of the time.
