= Georg Braun =

German cleric, canon, dean and topographer (1541–1622)

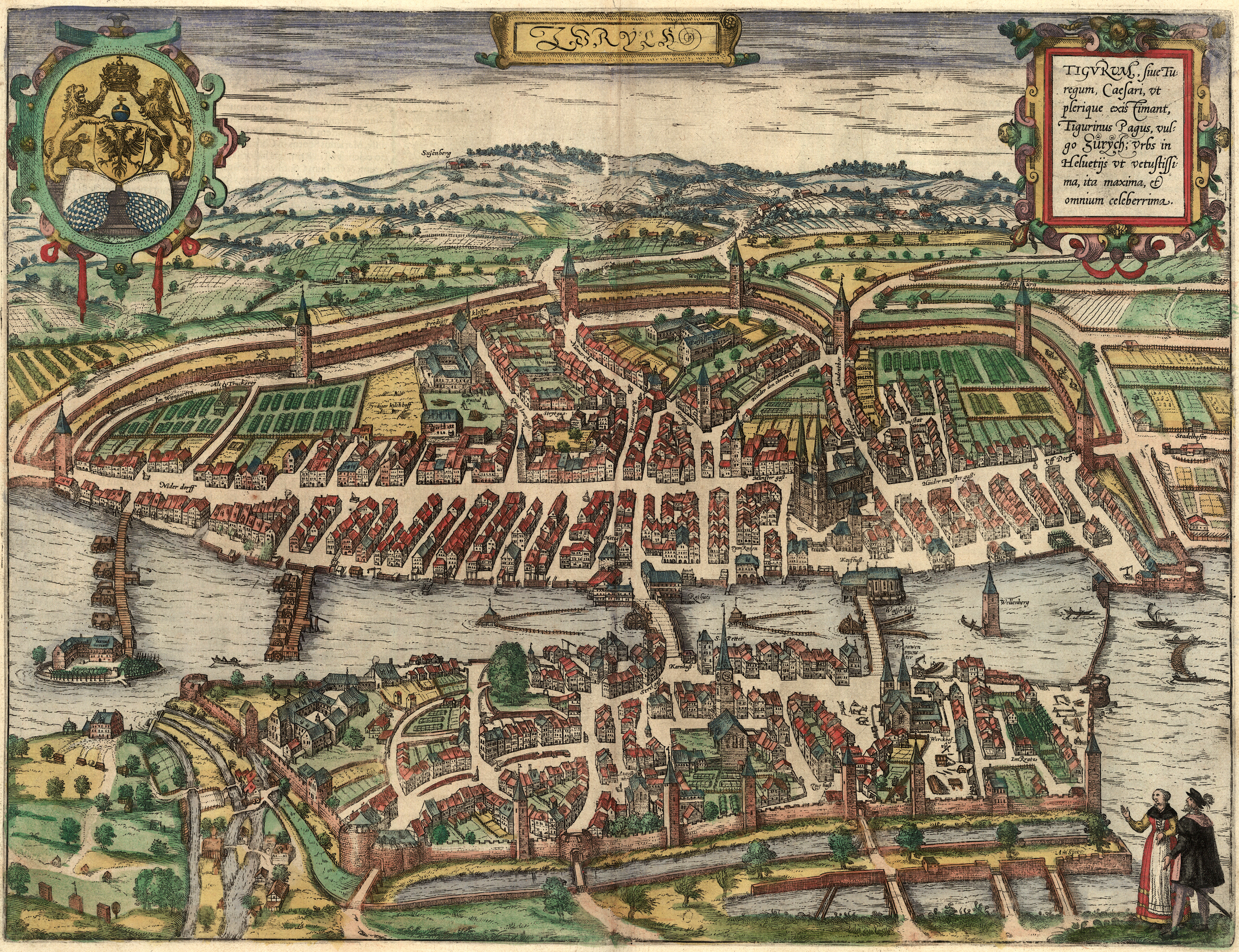
- A 1581 bird's-eye etching of Zürich, published by Georg Braun and Frans Hogenberg.
- Born: Georg Braun; 1 January 1541; Cologne, Electorate of Cologne, Holy Roman Empire
- Died: 10 March 1622 (aged 81); Cologne, Electorate of Cologne, Holy Roman Empire
- Occupations: Cleric, topographer, editor, publisher
- Known for: Principal editor of the Civitates Orbis Terrarum
- Notable work: Civitates Orbis Terrarum*
- Partner: Frans Hogenberg
- Children: None

Georg Braun (also Brunus, Bruin; 1541 – 10 March 1622) was a German topo-geographer. From 1572 to 1617, he edited the Civitates orbis terrarum which contains 546 prospects, bird's-eye views and maps of cities from all around the world. As principal editor of the work, he acquired the tables, hired the artists, and wrote the texts. He died as an octogenarian in 1622, the only survivor of the original team to witness the publication of volume VI in 1617.

== Career ==
Braun was born and died in Cologne. His principal profession was a Catholic cleric. He spent thirty-seven years as canon and dean at the church, St. Maria ad Gradus, in Cologne.

His six-volume work was inspired by Sebastian Münster's Cosmographia. In form and layout it resembles the 1570 Theatrum orbis terrarum by Abraham Ortelius, as Ortelius was interested in a complementary companion for the Theatrum.

In 1572 the Civitates Orbis Terrarum (Atlas of Cities in the World) was published and is today noted as the first atlas that contained city maps. Braun recorded that London is "famed among many people for its commerce". The 546 city views in the atlas contain street plans for Venice and Frankfurt. The Civitates Orbis Terrarum must be regarded as 16th century European view of urban social, cultural, and economic life. In the 16th century the number of people who traveled increased. Pilgrims, tradesmen, students, and adventurers were joined by tourists. The interest in the 1572 Civitates Orbis Terrarum was significant and the atlas sold well. The entire atlas was crafted in six volumes and published between 1572 and 1618.

== Cartography ==
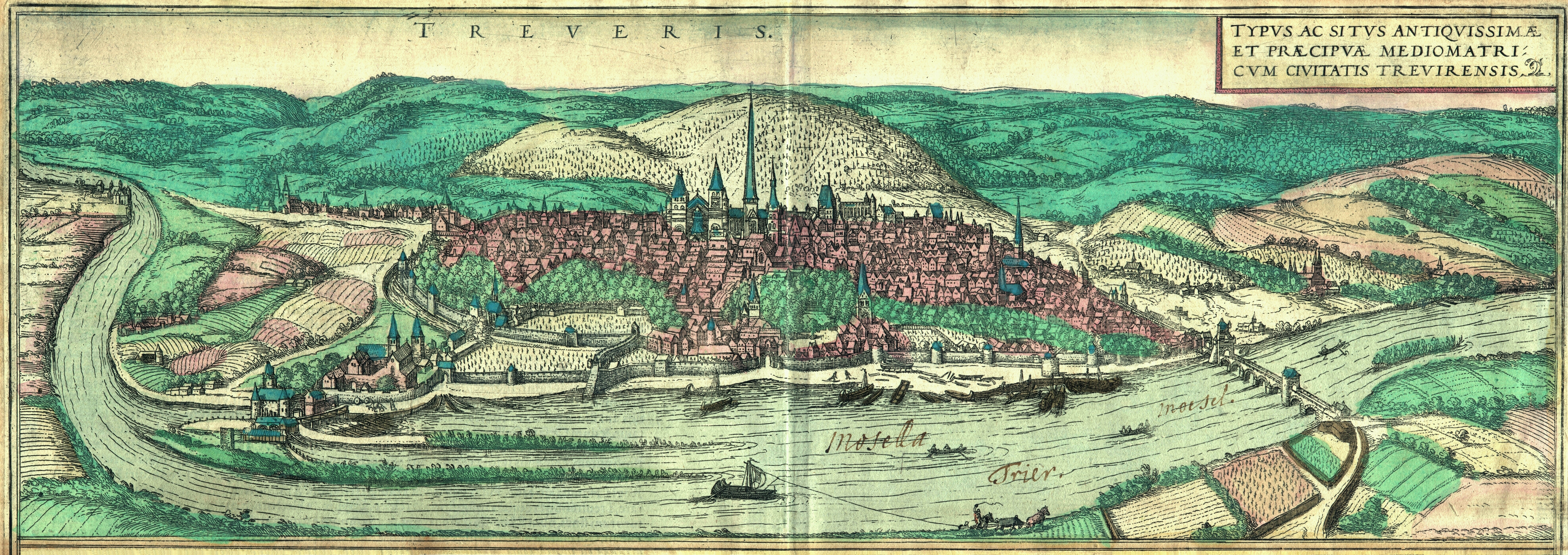
Historical view of Trier, Germany, published in Civitates Orbis Terrarum with Frans Hogenberg

The Braun publication set new standards in cartography for over 100 years. Frans Hogenberg (1535–1590, from Mechelen) created the tables for volumes I through IV, and Simon van den Neuwel created those for volumes V and VI. Other contributors were Joris Hoefnagel, Jacob Hoefnagel, cartographer Daniel Freese, and Heinrich Rantzau. Works by Jacob van Deventer, Sebastian Münster, and Johannes Stumpf were also used. Primarily European cities are depicted in the publication. However, Cairo Casablanca and Mexico City as well as Cuzco on one sheet are also included in volume I, whereas Tunis is featured in volume II.

== Sources ==
- James Elliot (1987), The City in Maps: Urban Mapping to 1900, British Library London, ISBN 0-7123-0134-8
- Ronald Vere Tooley (1979), Tooley's Dictionary of Mapmakers, ISBN 0-8451-1701-7
- Leo Bagrow, Abraham Ortelius: A. Ortelii Catalogus Cartographorum, J. Perthes (1928)

== Gallery ==
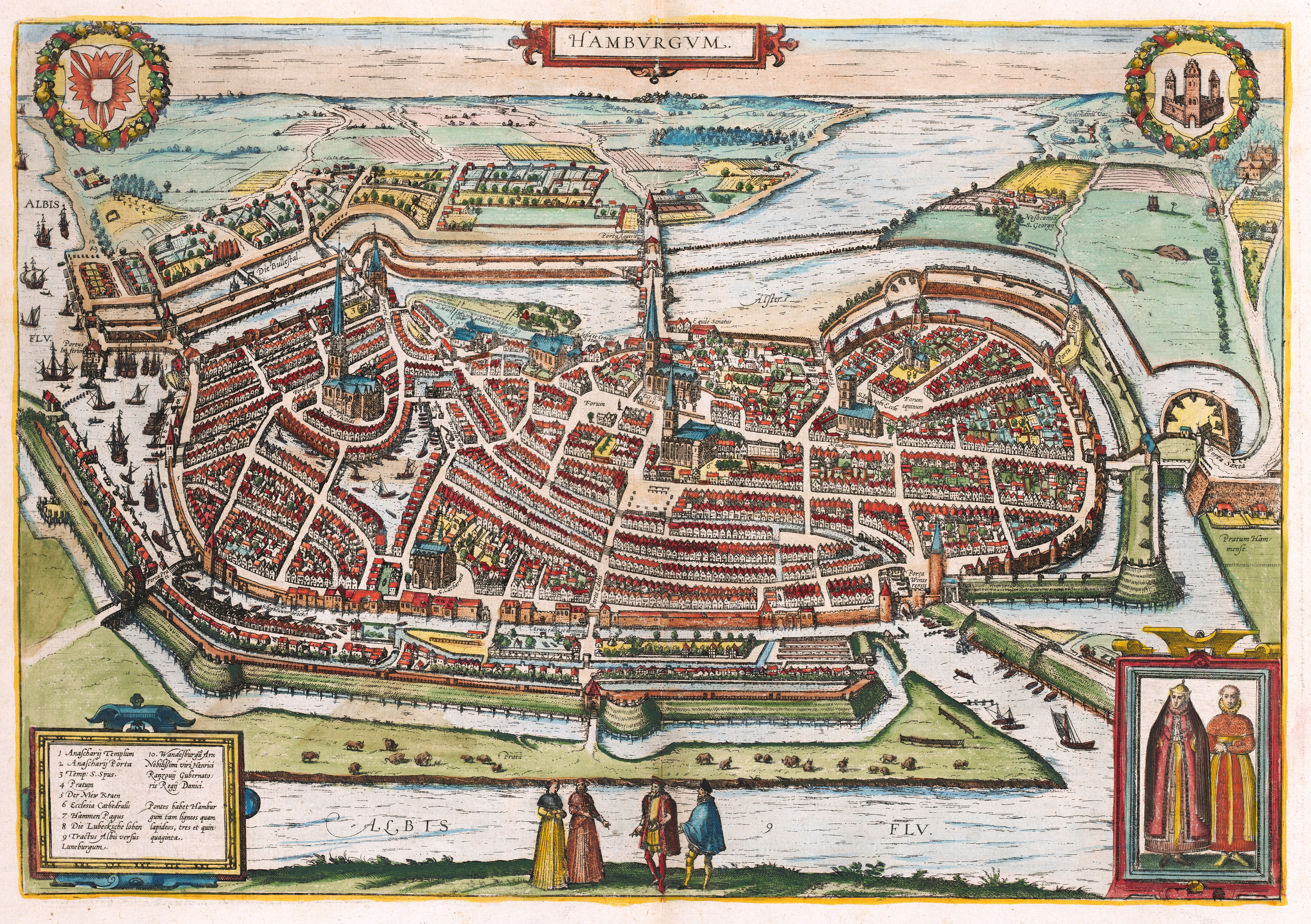
Hamburg (Hamburgum)

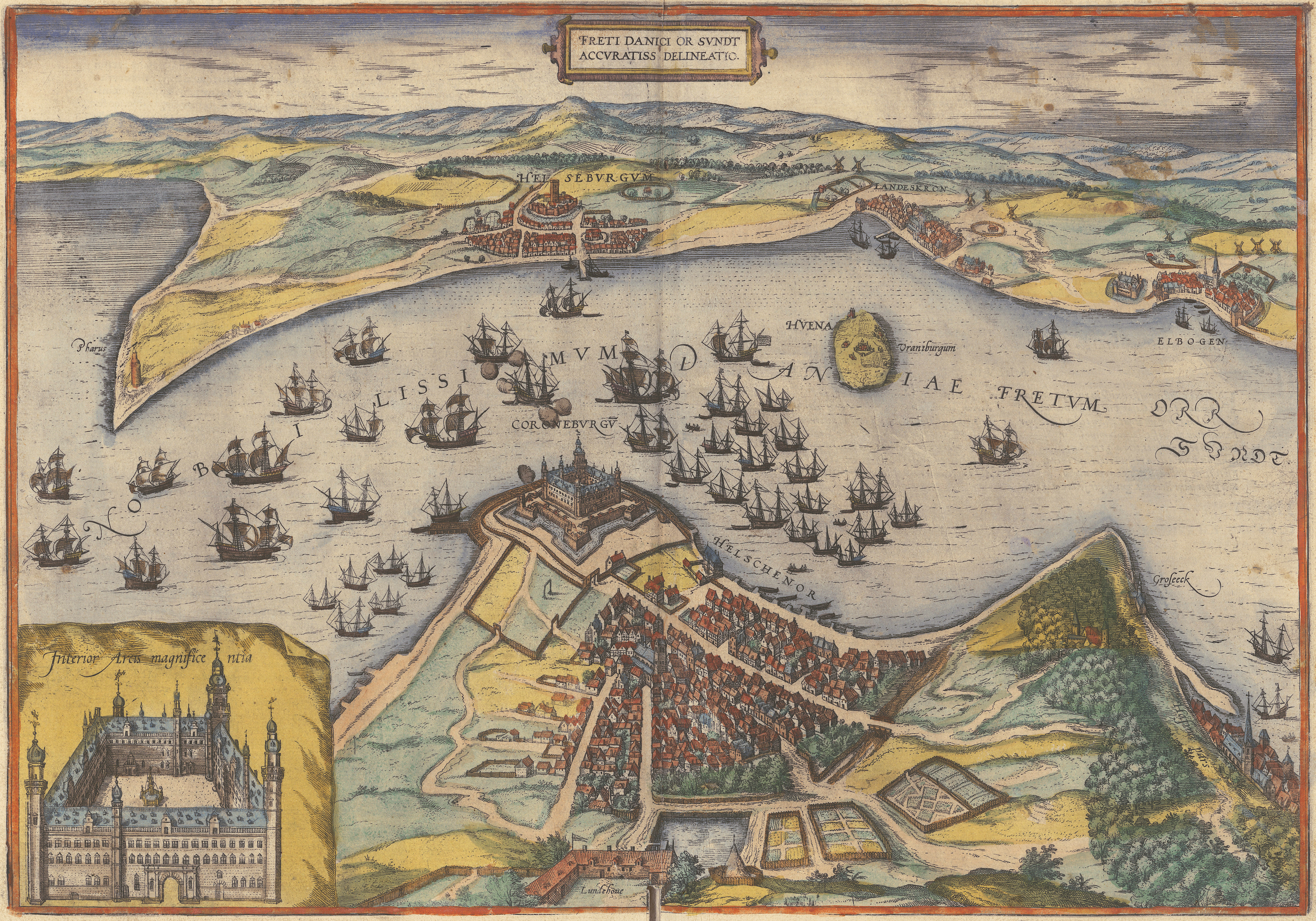
Kronborg Castle and the Øresund

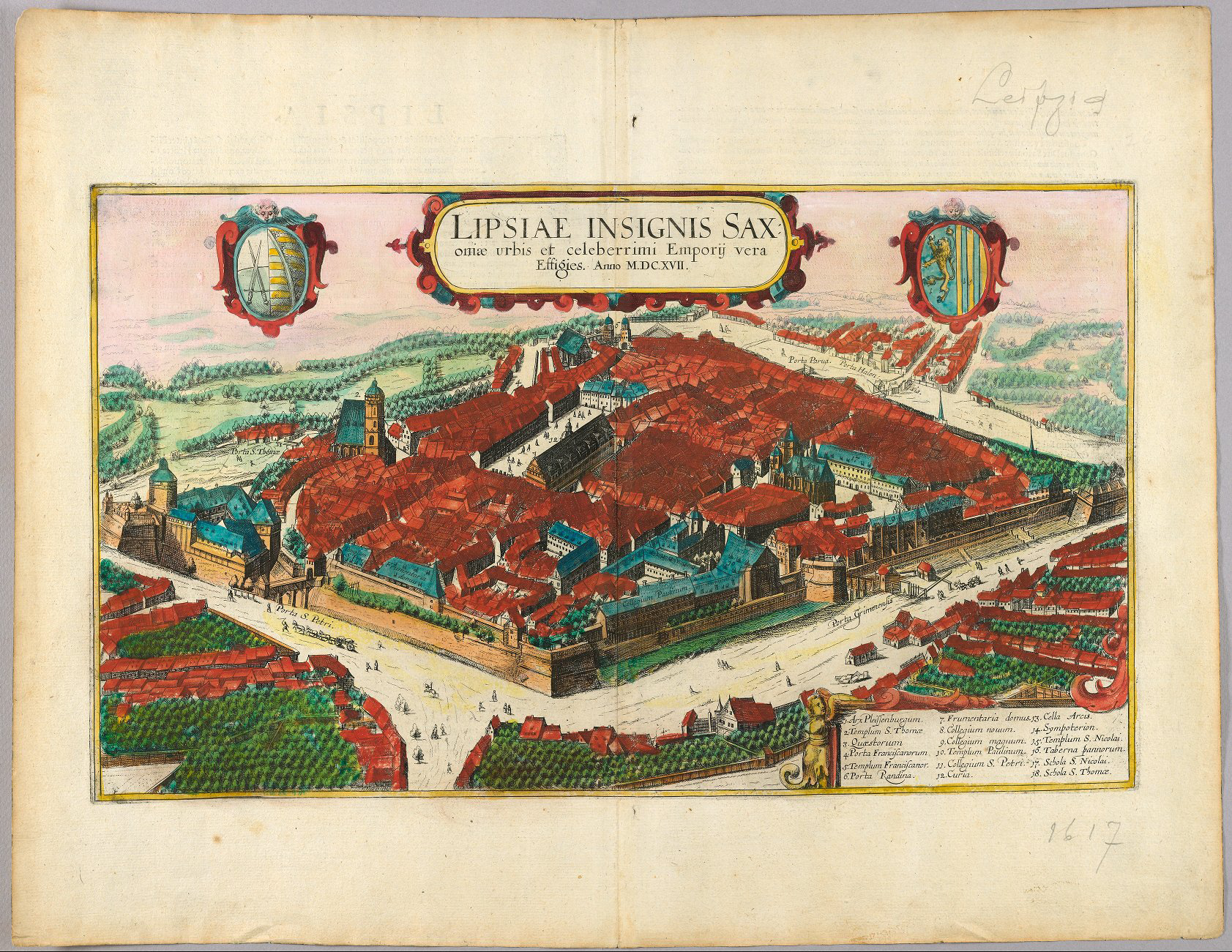
Leipzig (Lipsae Insignis)

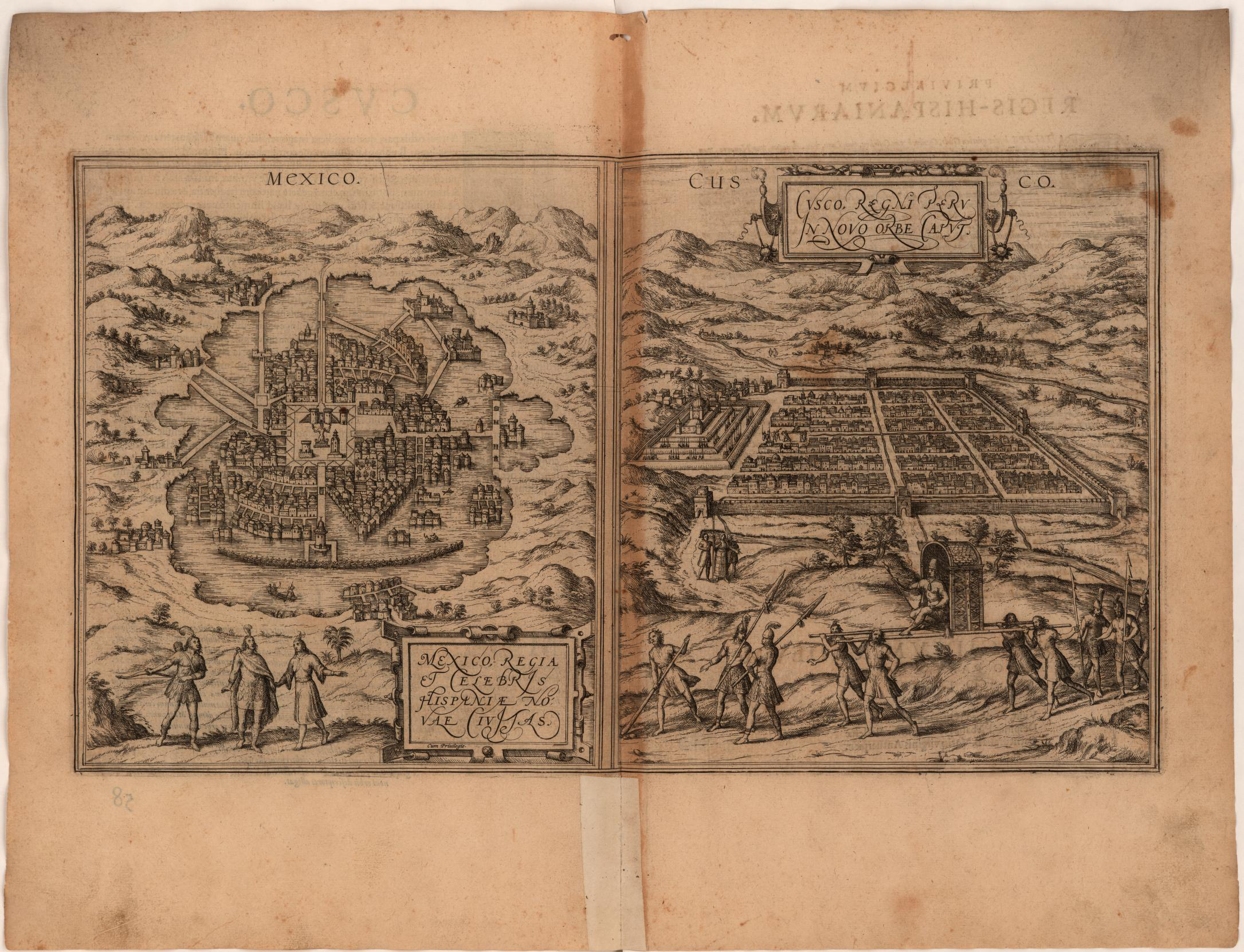
Mexico City and Cuzco

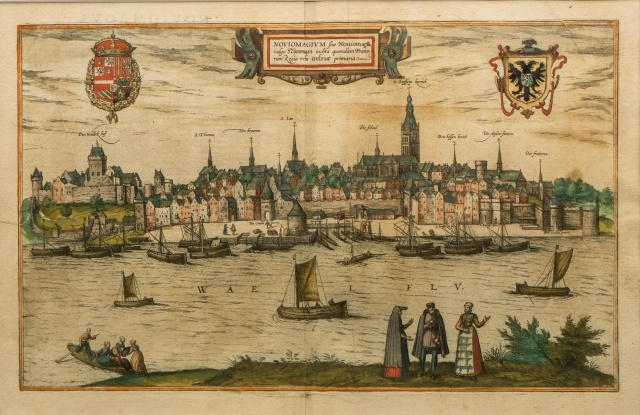
Nijmegen (Noviomagum)

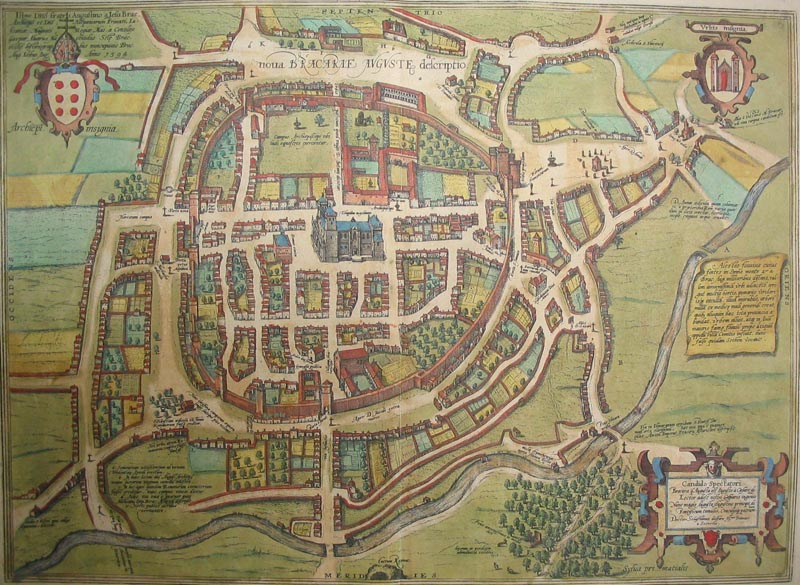
Braga (Bracara Augusta)

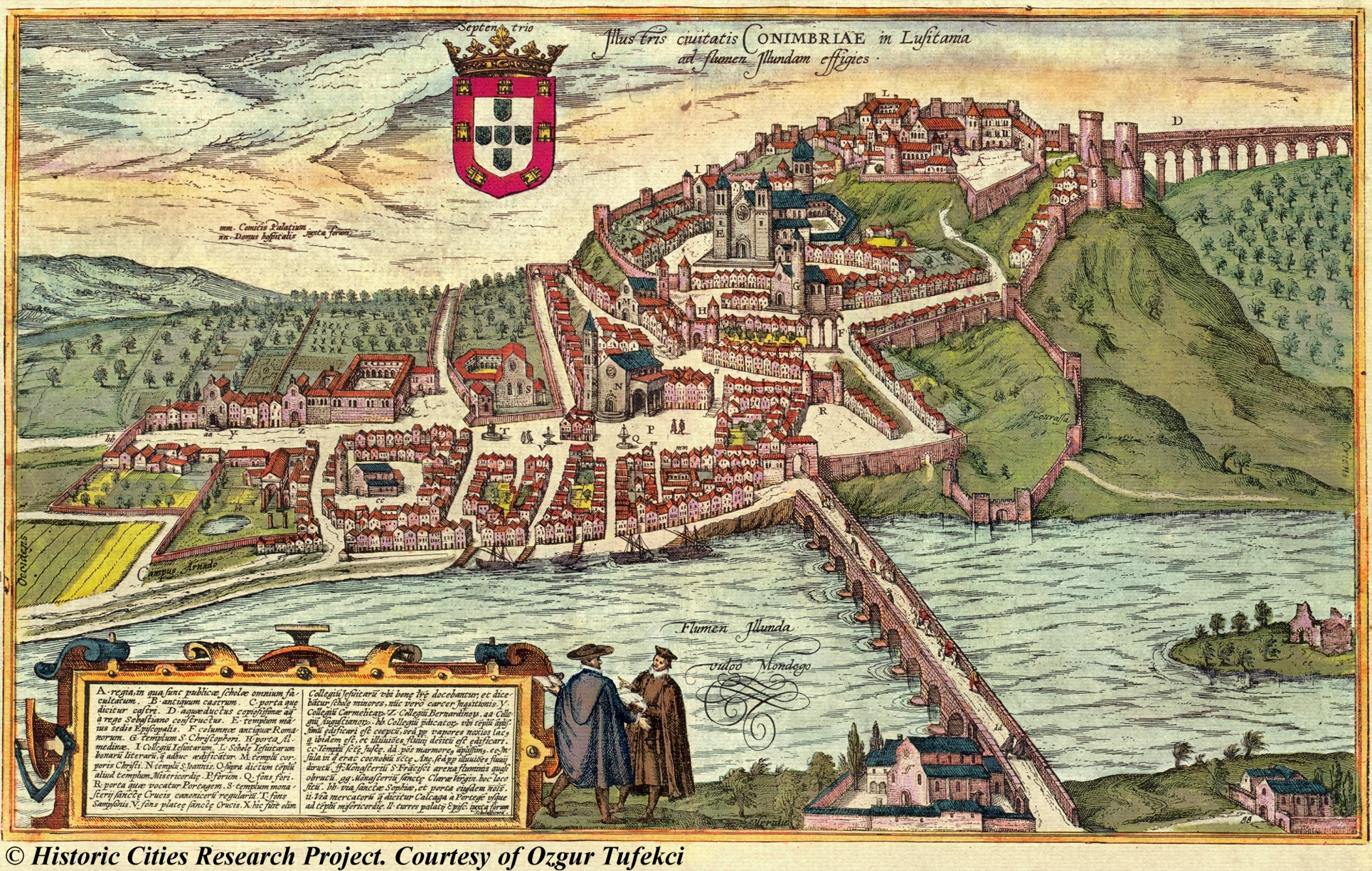
Coimbra (Conimbriae)

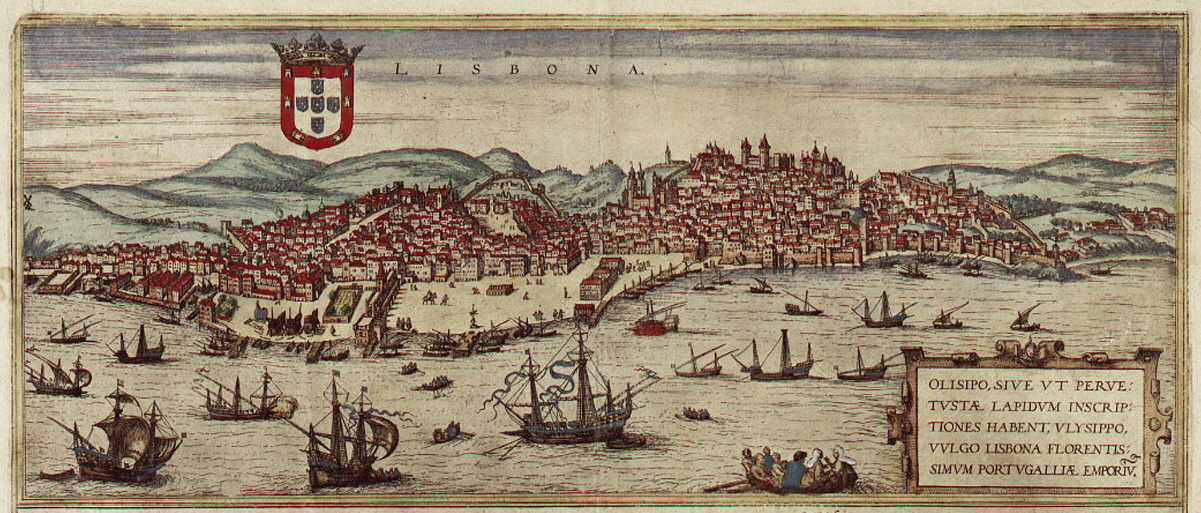
Lisbon (Olissipona)

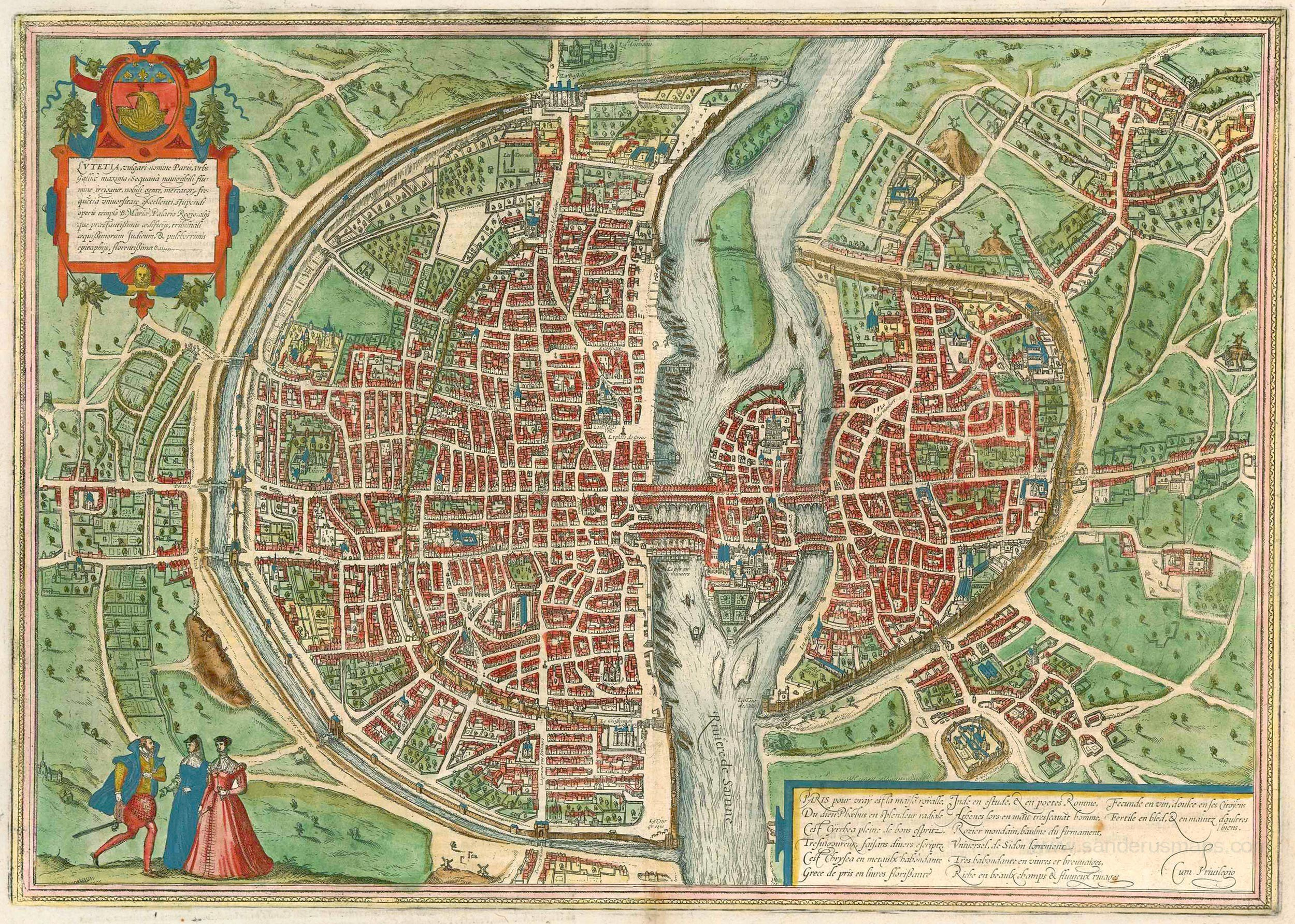
Paris (Lutetia)

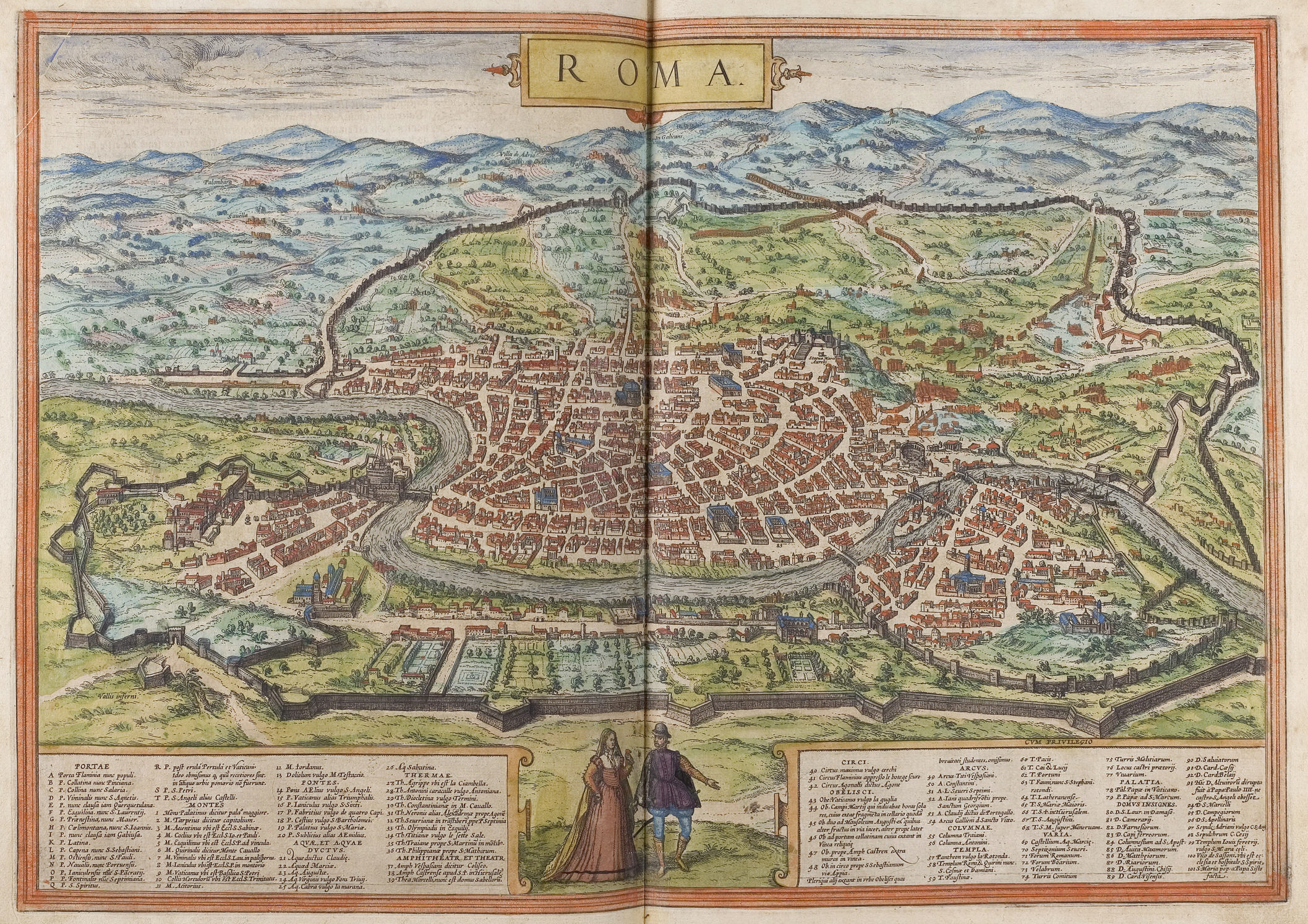
Rome (Roma)

== Works ==
- Braun, Georg (1572–1617). Civitates orbis terrarum (in Latin and German). Illustrator: Frans Hogenberg, Joris Hoefnagel, Simon Novellanus. LCCN 67040584. OCLC 898800860. OL 25045483W. Wikidata Q1769050.
