= Pietro Coppo =

16th-century Italian geographer and cartographer

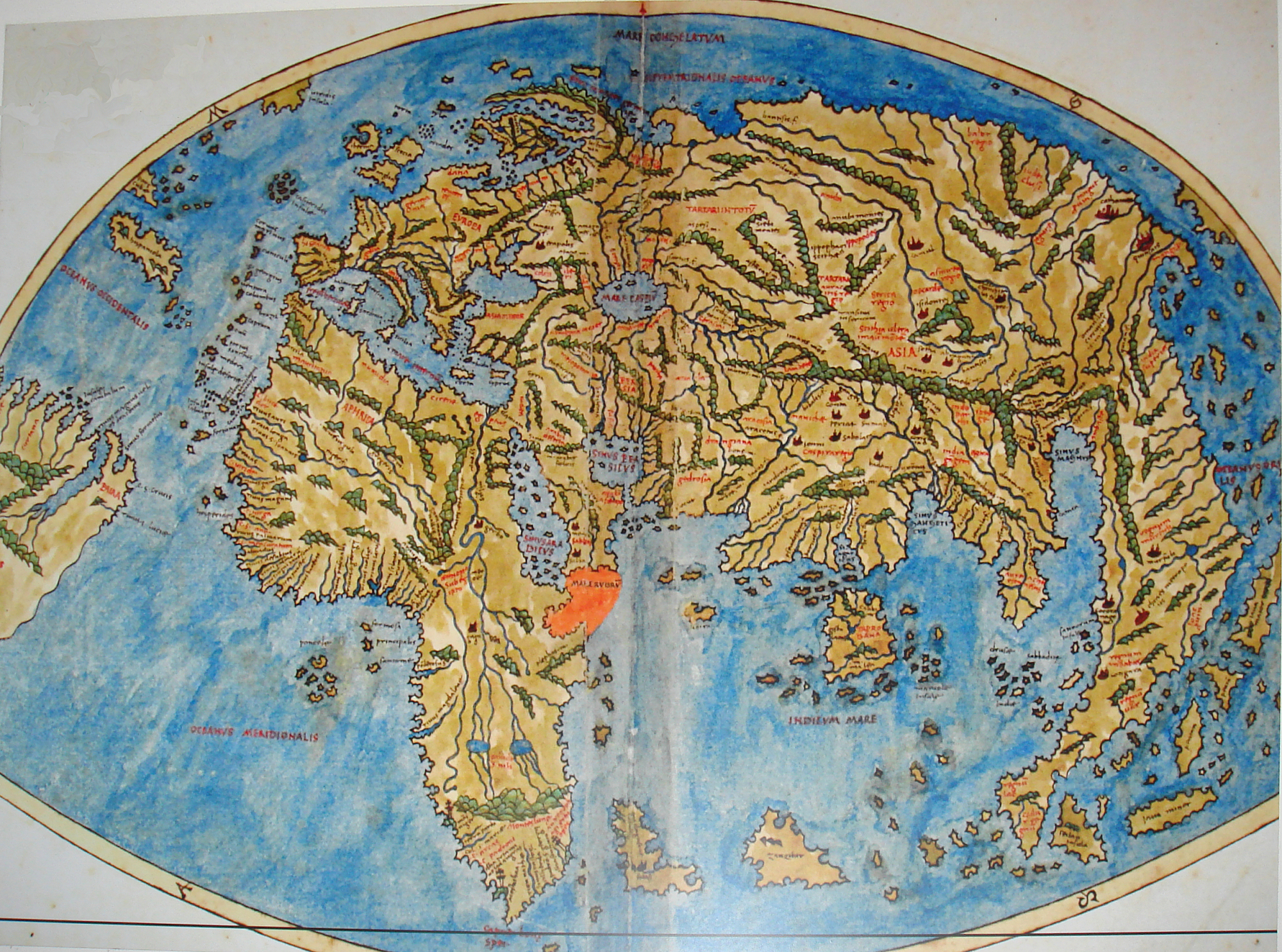
The world map by Pietro Coppo (1520)

Pietro Coppo (1469/70 – 1555/56; Latin: Petrus Coppus) was an Italian geographer and cartographer who wrote a description of the entire world as known in the 16th century, accompanied by a set of systematically arranged maps, one of the first rutters and also a precise description of the Istrian Peninsula, accompanied by its first regional map.

== Life ==
Pietro Coppo was born in Venice and studied with Marcus Antonius Coccius Sabellicus. He was also deeply influenced by the Natural History by Pliny. After a number of voyages across Italy and the Mediterranean and a period of six years he spent on Crete, in 1499 he moved to Izola due to his work duties as a municipal scribe, where he married Colotta di Ugo from a rich Izola family. He was active in the public life of the town, where he worked as a notary, and also represented it on several occasions before the Doge of Venice.

== Works ==
=== De toto orbe ===
Coppo's major work was the description, accompanied by an atlas of 22 maps, of the entire known world, titled De toto orbe. It was written in four volumes from 1518 until 1520 and also included the outline of the coast of the Americas, a military secret at the time, but remained unpublished. The two preserved samples of the work are kept in Bologna (Biblioteca comunale dell'Archiginnasio) and in Paris (Bibliothèque nationale de France).

=== De Summa totius Orbis ===
Woodcut map of Britain and Ireland, about 1525, from De Summa totius Orbis

From 1524 until 1526, Coppo prepared a shortened version of De toto orbe under the title De Summa totius Orbis. This work contained 15 systematically arranged woodcut maps, named Tabulae ("tables"), to be published in a book, thus representing the first "modern" atlas, though this distinction is conventionally awarded to Abraham Ortelius. It has been preserved in three copies, kept in Venice, Paris and Piran. Only the Piran manuscript contains the maps.

=== Portolano ===
In 1528, he published the work Portolano, one of the first rutters in the world. Although not preserved in entirety (probably due to frequent usage), its copies have been preserved in Piran (Slovenia), Paris, and London (the British Museum).

=== Del sito de l'Istria ===
In his description of Istria (Del sito de l'Istria; 1529, published in 1540, Venice), he published the first geographic description and a copy of the first regional map of Istria, produced in 1525 and already included in De Summa totius Orbis. Its copy inscribed in stone can now be seen in Pietro Coppo Park in the center of the town of Izola in southwestern Slovenia.

== Piran Codex ==
Two manuscripts of De Summa totius Orbis and Portolano, bound in a single text-block, together with printed woodcut maps, are kept in the Sergej Mašera Maritime Museum in Piran. The document is probably the most important cartographic work in Slovenia and world-class cultural heritage. It is unique primarily because, unlike other preserved works by Coppa, it contains 15 colorized, systematically-arranged, woodcut maps.
