= Maris Pacifici =

Map of the Pacific Ocean

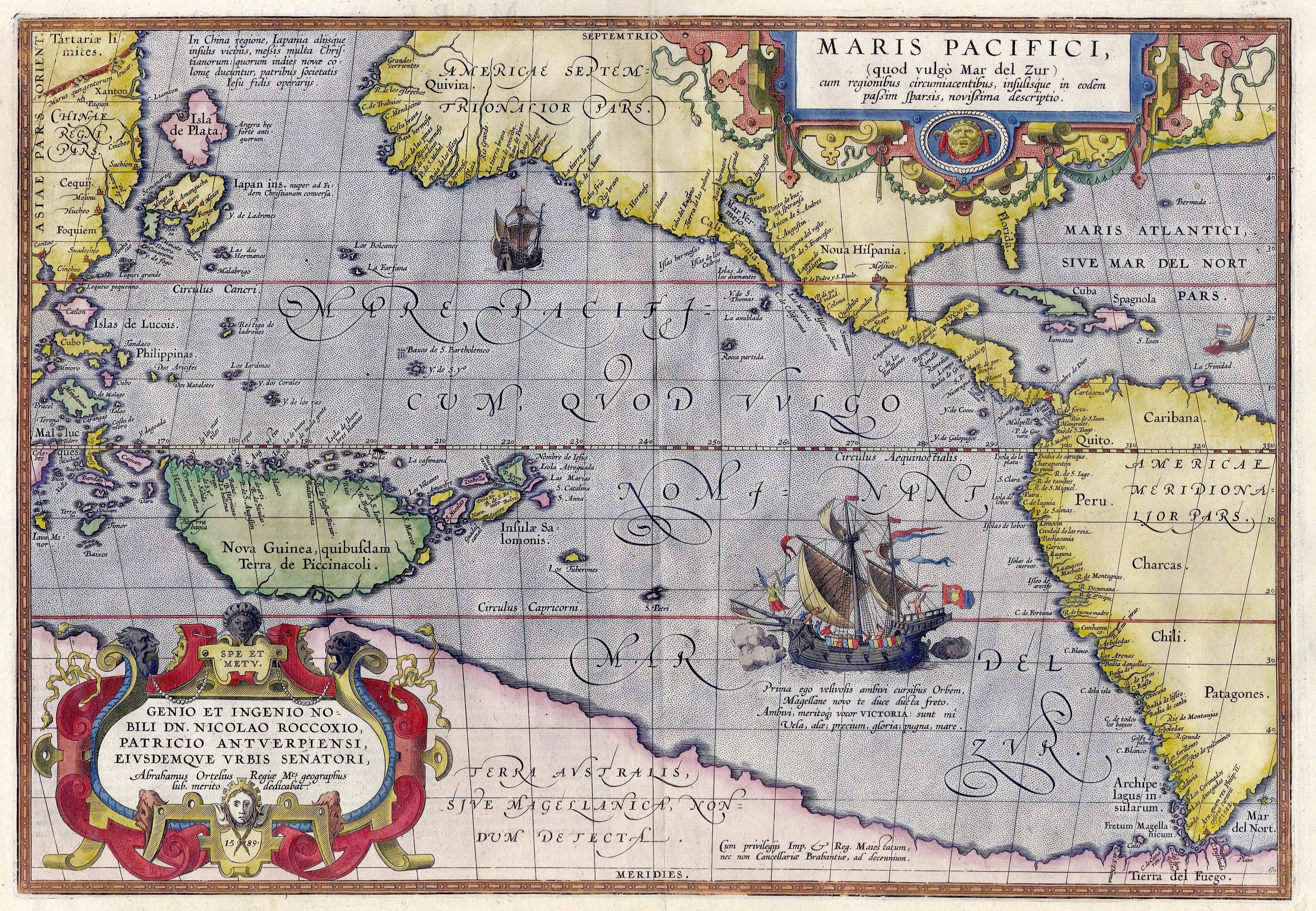

Maris Pacifici, more accurately named the Descriptio Maris Pacifici ("Description of the Pacific Ocean"), was the first dedicated map of the Pacific to be printed. It is considered an important advancement in cartography.

This map was drawn by Abraham Ortelius in 1589, based on a map of America from the same year that was drawn by Frans Hogenberg. Some details of the map may have been influenced by a 1568 description of Japan in a manuscript by Vaz Dourado, rather than a map, hence its peculiar shape.

The landmass illustrated to the south of all of the Pacific and South America is a representation of Terra Australis.

== See also ==
- Mappa mundi
- Early world maps
