= Cartouche (cartography) =

Decorative emblem on a globe or map

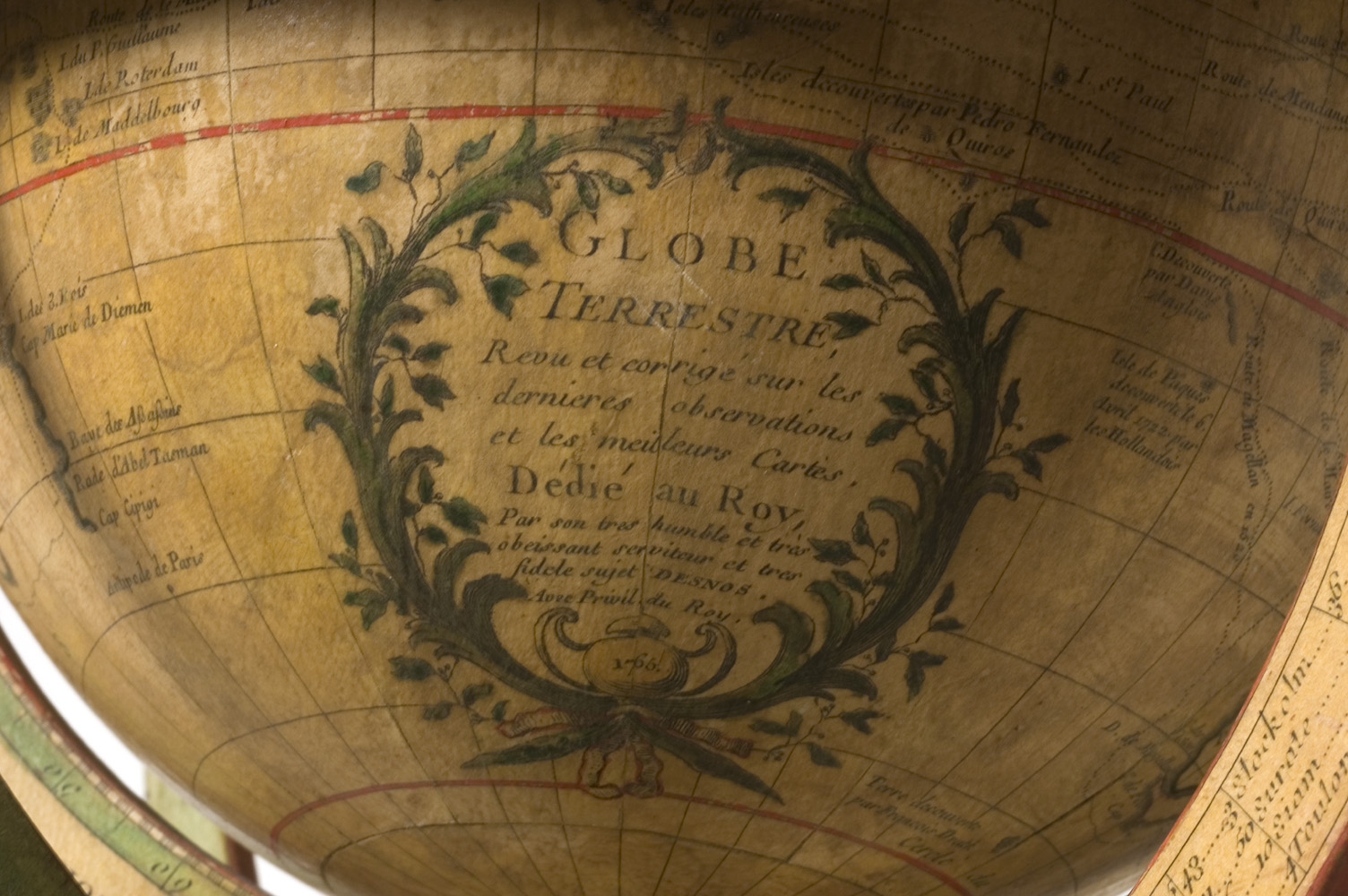
Detail showing cartouche on the 1765 de l'Isle globe

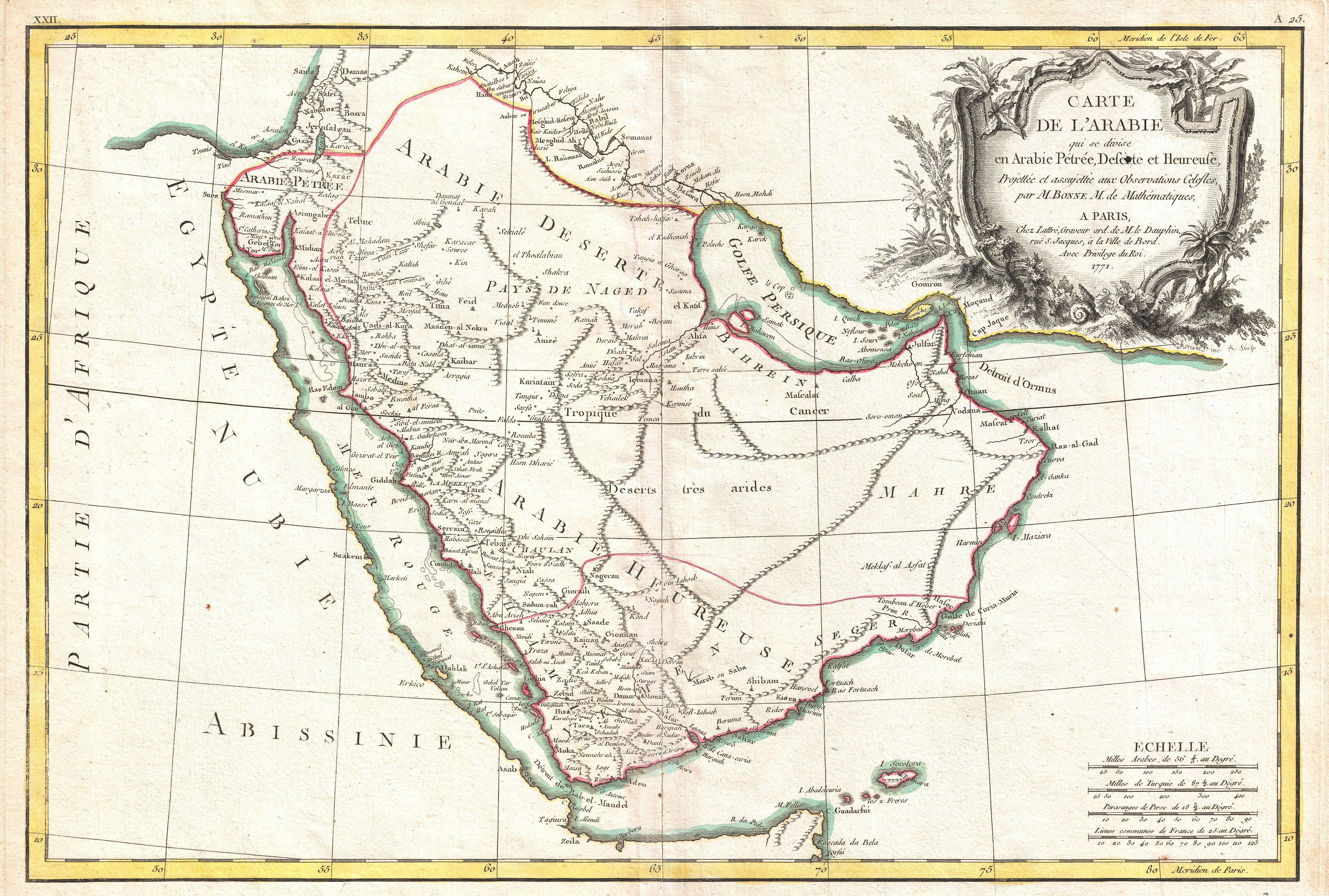
1771 decorative map of the Arabian Peninsula with a large decorative title cartouche in the upper right

A cartouche in cartography is a decorative emblem on a globe or map.

Map cartouches may contain the title, the printer's address, date of publication, the scale of the map and legends, and sometimes a dedication.

The design of cartouches varies according to cartographer and period style. The cartouche emerged from decorative borders around the map in the 15th century. These were largely modelled after Italian precedent (simple strapwork), but later architectural and figurative elements (like coats of arms) were added. The imagery often had the purpose of backing up a ruler's claim to territory.

The cartographic cartouche had its heyday in the Baroque period. Toward the end of the 18th century ornamental effects in cartography became less popular, and their style developed into simple ovals or they were omitted entirely.

== See also ==
- Cartouche (design)
