= Abraham Ortelius =

Dutch cartographer, geographer and cosmographer (1527–1598)

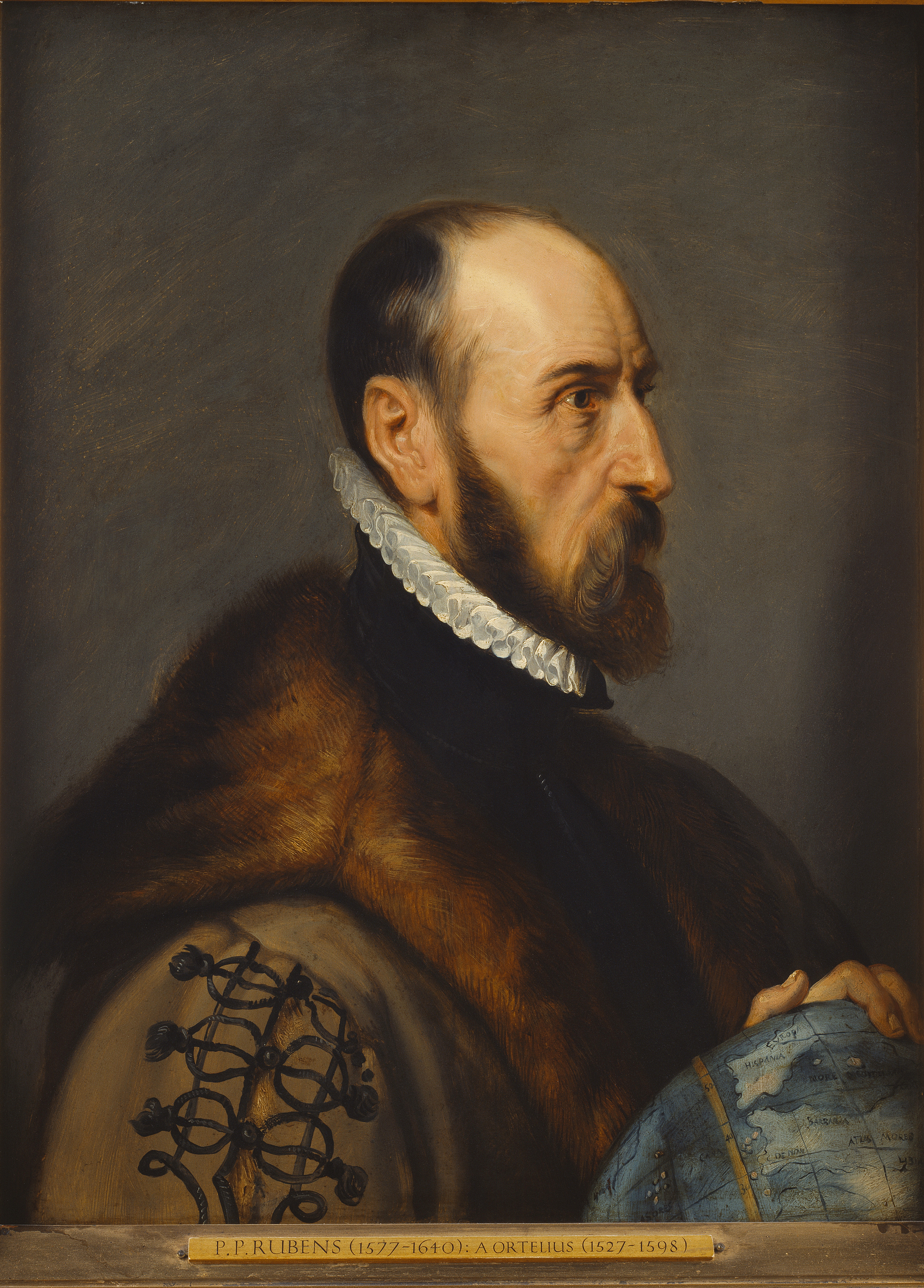
- Ortelius by Peter Paul Rubens, 1633, after a 1570s engraving by Philip Galle
- Born: 4 or 14 April 1527; Antwerp, Habsburg Netherlands
- Died: 28 June 1598 (aged 71); Antwerp, Spanish Netherlands
- Occupations: Geographer; cartographer
- Known for: Creator of the first modern atlas; proposing the idea of continental drift

Abraham Ortelius (/ɔːrˈtiːliəs/ or-TEE-lee-əs; also Ortels, Orthellius or Wortels; 4 or 14 April 1527 – 28 June 1598) was a cartographer, geographer, and cosmographer from Antwerp in the Spanish Netherlands. He is recognized as the creator of the first modern atlas, the Theatrum Orbis Terrarum ('Theatre of the World'). Along with Gemma Frisius and Gerardus Mercator, Ortelius is generally considered one of the founders of the Netherlandish school of cartography and geography. He was a notable figure of this school in its golden age (approximately 1570s–1670s) and an important geographer of Spain during the age of discovery. The publication of his atlas in 1570 is often considered as the official beginning of the Golden Age of Netherlandish cartography. He was the first person proposing that the continents were joined before drifting to their present positions.

== Life ==
Abraham Ortelius was born on either 4 April or 14 April 1527 in the city of Antwerp, which was then in the Spanish Netherlands. The Ortels or Wortels (latinized as Orthellius and Ortelius) family was originally from Augsburg, a Free imperial city of the Holy Roman Empire. Abraham's grandfather, Willem Ortels, was a pharmacist. He had moved in 1460 to Antwerp where he married Mathilde 's Jagers, alias Reynaerts. They had five children: Imbert who inherited his father's pharmacy, Anna, Odille (or Ottilia of Odilia), who married Nicolaes van der Voorden, a merchant in Brussels, and, in her second marriage, Jacobus van Meteren from Breda, who was a Protestant and supervised the printing of English versions of the bible in England, Leonard (born in 1500 and father of Abraham Ortelius) and Josef. From his second marriage with Maria Antheard a son called Willem was born. The family lived in the Kipdorp street in Antwerp and was fairly well off. Leonard Ortelius married Anna Herwayers and they had three children, Abraham, Anna who would stay on her brother's side and Elisabeth who married a trader named Jacob Cool Sr., whose son Jacob Cool Jr. (known as Ortelianus) would be the principal heir of Abraham Ortelius.

Leonard Ortelius was well educated. He spoke Greek and Latin, and worked with his brother-in-law Jacob van Meteren on the translation of Miles Coverdale's English Bible. In 1535, they were both prosecuted for possessing suspicious books. Searches turned up nothing and the case was subsequently dismissed. Leonard Ortelius was a successful antique dealer. Following the death of his father, Abraham Ortelius's uncle Jacobus van Meteren returned from exile in England to take care of him. Abraham remained close to his cousin Emanuel van Meteren, who would later move to London. In 1575 Abraham was appointed geographer to the king of Spain, Philip II, on the recommendation of Arias Montanus, who vouched for his orthodoxy.

He traveled extensively in Europe and is specifically known to have traveled throughout the Habsburg Netherlands; in southern, western, northern, and eastern Germany (e.g., 1560, 1575–1576); France (1559–1560); England and Ireland (1576); and Italy (1578, and perhaps two or three times between 1550 and 1558).

Beginning as a map-engraver, in 1547 he entered the Antwerp Guild of Saint Luke as an illuminator of maps. He supplemented his income trading in books, prints, and maps, and his journeys included annual visits to the Frankfurt book and print fair, where he met Gerardus Mercator in 1554. In 1560, however, when travelling with Mercator to Trier, Lorraine, and Poitiers, he seems to have been attracted, largely by Mercator's influence, towards the career of a scientific geographer. He died in Antwerp.

== Map publisher ==
1570 Typus Orbis Terrarum

In 1564, he published his first map, “Nova Totius Terrarum Orbis Iuxta Neo Terricorum Traditiones Descripto”, an eight-leaved wall map of the world, on which he identified the Regio Patalis with Locach as a northward extension of the Terra Australis, reaching as far as New Guinea. (the only extant copy is now at Basel University Library). He also published a two-sheet map of Egypt in 1565, a plan of the Brittenburg castle on the coast of the Netherlands in 1568, an eight-sheet map of Asia in 1567, and a six-sheet map of Spain before the appearance of his atlas.

In England Ortelius's contacts included William Camden, Richard Hakluyt, Thomas Penny, Puritan controversialist William Charke, and Humphrey Llwyd, who would contribute the map of England and Wales to Ortelius's 1573 edition of the Theatrum.

In 1578, he laid the basis of a critical treatment of ancient geography by his Synonymia geographica (issued by the Plantin Press at Antwerp and republished in expanded form as Thesaurus geographicus in 1587 and again expanded in 1596; in the last edition, Ortelius considers the possibility of continental drift, a hypothesis that would be proved correct only centuries later).

In 1596, he received a presentation from Antwerp, similar to that afterwards bestowed on Peter Paul Rubens. His death on 28 June 1598 and his burial in the church of St. Michael's Abbey, Antwerp, were marked by public mourning. The inscription on his tombstone reads: Quietis cultor sine lite, uxore, prole ("served quietly, without accusation, wife, and offspring").

=== Theatrum Orbis Terrarum ===
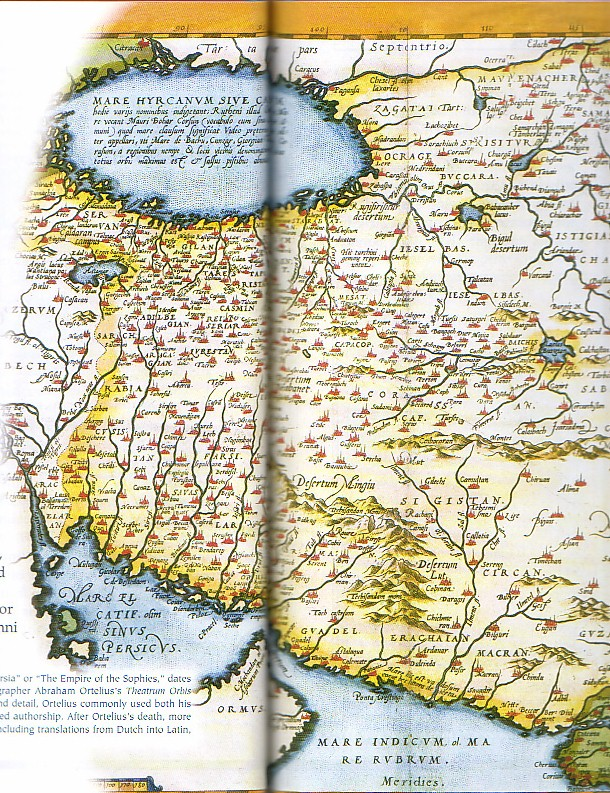
Map of the Persian Empire from the Theatrum Orbis Terrarum

On 20 May 1570, Gilles Coppens de Diest at Antwerp issued Ortelius's Theatrum Orbis Terrarum, the "first modern atlas" (of 53 maps). (Note: The first work that contained systematically arranged maps of uniform size, intended to be published in a book, thus representing the first modern atlas, was De Summa totius Orbis (1524–26) by the 16th-century Italian cartographer Pietro Coppo. Nonetheless, this distinction is conventionally awarded to Abraham Ortelius.) Three Latin editions of this (besides a Dutch, a French, and a German edition) appeared before the end of 1572; twenty-five editions came out before Ortelius's death in 1598; and several others were published subsequently, for the atlas continued to be in demand until about 1612. Most of the maps were admittedly reproductions (a list of 87 authors is given in the first Theatrum by Ortelius himself, growing to 183 names in the 1601 Latin edition), and many discrepancies of delineation or nomenclature occur. Errors, of course, abound, both in general conceptions and in detail; thus South America is initially very faulty in outline, but corrected in the 1587 French edition, and in Scotland, the Grampians lie between the Forth and the Clyde; but, taken as a whole, this atlas with its accompanying text was a monument of rare erudition and industry. Its immediate precursor and prototype was a collection of thirty-eight maps of European lands, and of Asia, Africa, Tartary, and Egypt, gathered together by the wealth and enterprise, and through the agents, of Ortelius's friend and patron, Gillis Hooftman (1521–1581), lord of Cleydael and Aertselaar: most of these were printed in Rome, eight or nine only in the Southern Netherlands.

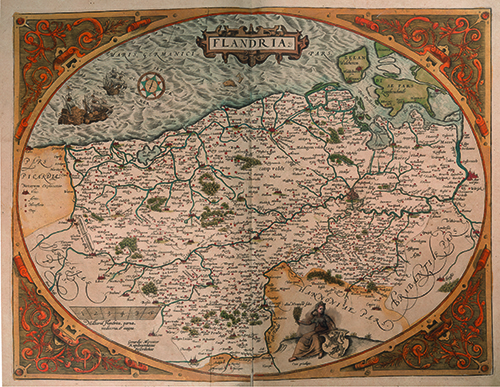
Map of Flanders from the Theatrum orbis terrarum, 1574, The Phoebus Foundation

In 1573, Ortelius published seventeen supplementary maps under the title Additamentum Theatri Orbis Terrarum. Four more Additamenta were to follow, the last one appearing in 1597. He also had a keen interest in and formed a fine collection of coins, medals and antiques, and this resulted in the book (also in 1573, published by Philippe Galle of Antwerp) Deorum dearumque capita ... ex Museo Ortelii ("Heads of the gods and goddesses... from the Ortelius Museum"); reprinted in 1582, 1602, 1612, 1680, 1683 and finally in 1699 by Gronovius, Thesaurus Graecarum Antiquitatum ("Treasury of Greek Antiquities", vol. vii).

The Theatrum Orbis Terrarum inspired a six-volume work titled Civitates orbis terrarum, edited by Georg Braun and illustrated by Frans Hogenberg with the assistance of Ortelius himself, who visited England to see his friend John Dee in Mortlake in 1577, and Braun tells of Ortelius putting pebbles in cracks in Temple Church, Bristol, being crushed by the vibration of the bells.

=== Later maps ===
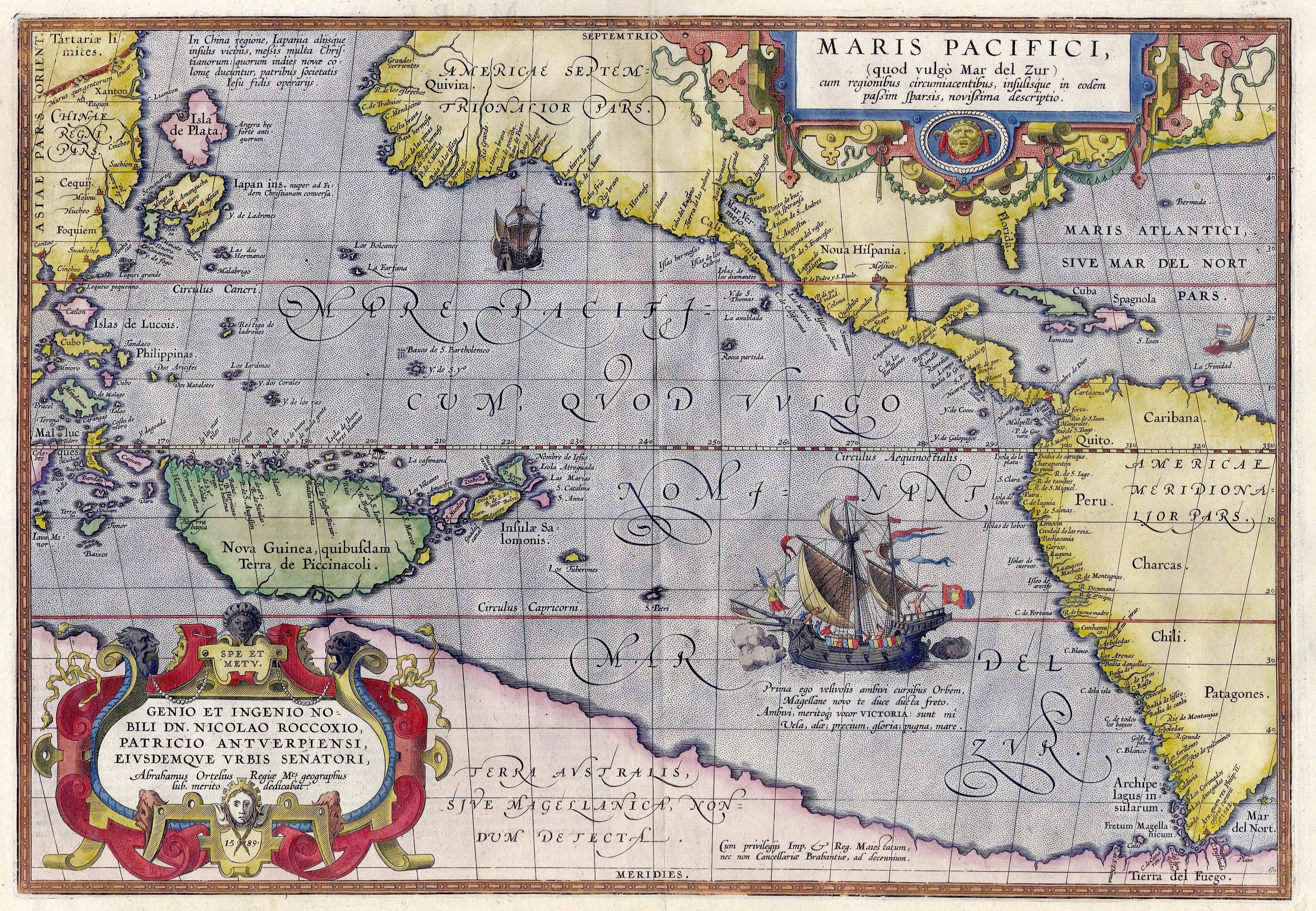
Maris Pacifici

In 1579, Ortelius brought out his Nomenclator Ptolemaicus and started his Parergon (a series of maps illustrating ancient history, sacred and secular). He also published Itinerarium per nonnullas Galliae Belgicae partes (at the Plantin press in 1584, and reprinted in 1630, 1661 in Hegenitius, Itin. Frisio-Hoil., in 1667 by Verbiest, and finally in 1757 in Leuven), a record of a journey in Belgium and the Rhineland made in 1575. In 1589 he published Maris Pacifici, the first dedicated map of the Pacific to be printed. Among his last works were an edition of Caesar (C. I. Caesaris omnia quae extant, Leiden, Raphelingen, 1593), and the Aurei saeculi imago, sive Germanorum veterum vita, mores, ritus et religio. (Philippe Galle, Antwerp, 1596). He also aided Welser in his edition of the Peutinger Table in 1598.

Contrary to popular belief, Ortelius, who had no children, never lived at the Mercator-Orteliushuis (Kloosterstraat 11–17, Antwerpen), but lived at his sister's house (Kloosterstraat 33–35, Antwerpen).

== Modern use of maps ==
Originals of Ortelius's maps are popular collector's items and often sell for tens of thousands of dollars. Facsimiles of his maps are also available from many retailers. A map he made of North and South America is also included in the world's largest commercially available jigsaw puzzle, which is of four world maps. This puzzle is made by Ravensburger, measures 6 feet (1.8 m) × 9 feet (2.7 m), and has over 18,000 pieces.

== Imagining continental drift ==
Ortelius was the first to underline the geometrical similarity between the coasts of America and Europe-Africa and to propose continental drift as an explanation. Kious describes Ortelius's thoughts in this way:

Abraham Ortelius in his work Thesaurus Geographicus [...] suggested that the Americas were "torn away from Europe and Africa [...] by earthquakes and floods" and went on to say: "The vestiges of the rupture reveal themselves, if someone brings forward a map of the world and considers carefully the coasts of the three [continents]."

Ortelius's proposal, from his observations by visual juxtaposition, of ancient continental proximity, rupture, and separation went unnoticed until the late 20th century. However, they were repeated in the 18th and 19th centuries (for example, Antonio Snider-Pellegrini) and later by Alfred Wegener, who published his hypothesis of continental drift in 1912 and in following years. Because his publications were widely available in German and English and because he adduced geological support for the idea, Wegener is credited by most geologists as the first to recognize the possibility of continental drift. Frank Bursley Taylor (in 1908) was also an early advocate of continental drift. During the 1960s, geophysical and geological evidence for seafloor spreading at mid-oceanic ridges became increasingly compelling to geologists (e.g. Harry H. Hess, 1960) and finally established continental drift as an ongoing global mechanism (e.g. by the work of W. Jason Morgan by 1967 and Dan McKenzie in 1968). After more than three centuries, Ortelius's supposition of continental drift was vindicated.

== Bibliography ==
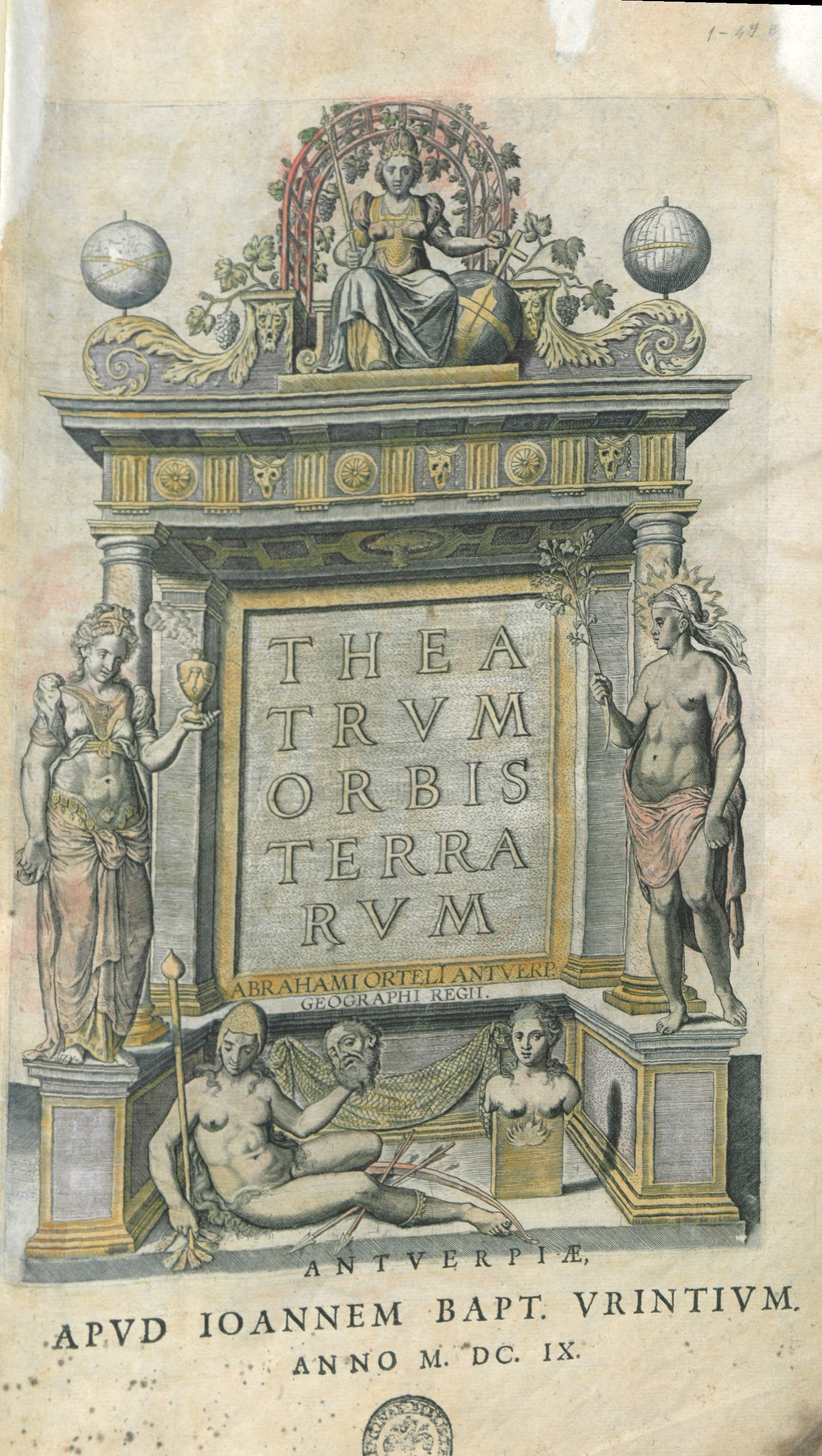
Theatrum Orbis Terrarum, 1609

- Ortelius, Abraham (1603). Nomenclator ptolemaicus (in Latin). Antwerpen: Robert Bruneau.
- Ortelius, Abraham (1609). Theatrum orbis terrarum (in Latin). Antwerpen: Jean Baptiste Vrints.
- Abraham Ortelius, Theatrum Orbis Terrarum. Gedruckt zu Nuermberg durch Johann Koler Anno MDLXXII. Mit einer Einführung und Erläuterungen von Ute Schneider. Second unchanged edition (2. unveränd. Aufl). Darmstadt, Wissenschaftliche Buchgesellschaft, 2007.

== Sources ==
- Binding, Paul (2003). Imagined Corners: exploring the world's first atlas. London: Review Books. ISBN 0747230404.
- Depuydt, Joost (2004). "Ortelius, Abraham (1527–1598)". Oxford Dictionary of National Biography (online ed.). Oxford University Press. doi:10.1093/ref:odnb/20854. (Subscription, Wikipedia Library access or UK public library membership required.)
- Génard, P. (1880). "La généalogie du géographe Abraham Ortelius". Bulletin de la Société royale de Géographie d'Anvers. 5: 312–49.
- Hess, H. H. (1960). "Nature of great oceanic ridges". Preprints of the First International Oceanographic Congress (New York, August 31 – September 12, 1959. Washington: American Association for the Advancement of Science. (A). pp. 33–34.
- Hessels, J. H., ed. (1887). Abrahami Ortelii epistulae. Ecclesiae Londino-Batavae archivvm. Vol. 1. Cambridge: C.J. Clay and Sons. (an edition of Ortelius's letters)
- Karrow, Robert J. Jr. (1993). Mapmakers of the Sixteenth Century and their Maps: bio-bibliographies of the cartographers of Abraham Ortelius, 1570. Chicago: Speculum Orbis Press. ISBN 0932757057.
- Koeman, C. (1964). The History of Abraham Ortelius and his Theatrum Orbis Terrarum. Lausanne: Sequoia.
- Rooses, Max (1880). "Ortelius et Plantin: note communiqué à M. P. Genard". Bulletin de la Société royale de géographie d'Anvers. 5: 350–356.
- van den Broecke, Marcel (2011) [1996]. Ortelius Atlas Maps: an illustrated guide (2nd ed.). Houten: HeS & De Graaf. ISBN 9789061943808.
- van den Broecke, Marcel; van der Krogt, Peter; Meurer, Peter, eds. (1998). Abraham Ortelius and the First Atlas: essays commemorating the quadricentennial of his death, 1598–1998. Houten: HeS Publishers. ISBN 9789061943884.
- van Meteren, Emanuel (1670). Historia Belgica. Amsterdam.
- Wauwermans, H. E. (1895). Histoire de l'école cartographique belge et anversoise du XVe siècle. Vol. 2. Brussels: Institute nationale de géographie. pp. 109–61, 452–59.
- Wauwermans, H. E. (1901). "Abraham Ortels ou Wortels, dit Ortelius, géographe et antiquaire". Biographie Nationale de Belgique. Vol. 16. Brussels: Bruylant-Christophe & Cie. pp. 291–332.
- Wegener, Alfred (July 1912). "Die Entstehung der Kontinente". Geologische Rundschau. 3 (4): 276–92. Bibcode:1912GeoRu...3..276W. doi:10.1007/BF02202896. S2CID 129316588.
- Wegener, Alfred (1966). The Origin of Continents and Oceans. Translated by Biram, John. New York: Dover. ISBN 0-486-61708-4. (Translated from the fourth revised German edition.)
- Wehrenberg, Charles (2001) [1995]. Before New York. San Francisco: Solo Zone. ISBN 1-886163-16-2.

== See also ==
- Theatrum Orbis Terrarum (Theatre of the World)
- History of cartography
- Early modern Netherlandish cartography
- Golden Age of Netherlandish cartography
