= Caleb George Cash =

British geographer

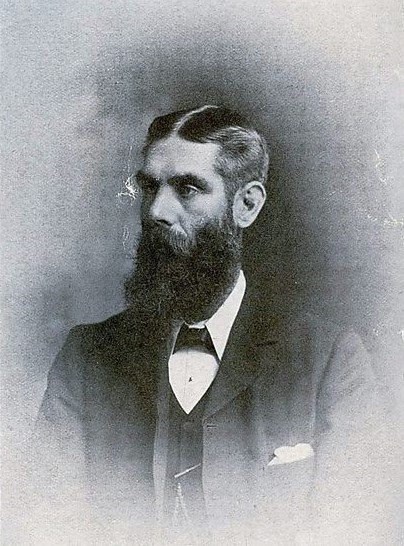
MacInnes (see body) characterizes this portrait of Cash that was printed opposite the title in his last book as that of a "lightly built man about 40 years old photographed with a stern (in the manner of the times) expression" with hair that is "immaculately combed".

Caleb George Cash (1857–1916), honorary fellow of the Royal Scottish Geographical Society (FRSGS), was a geographer, passionate mountaineer, and music and geography teacher, known for his work on preserving the maps of medieval Scotland made by Timothy Pont (c.1560–c.1627), which formed the basis for the Blaeu Atlas of Scotland, and for organizing and publishing a bibliography compiled by Arthur Mitchell throughout Mitchell's life. Born in Birmingham, England, educated in London, and having worked in the North of England for a while, in his 30s he settled in Scotland and pioneered climbing in the Cairngorms, a mountain range in the eastern part of the Scottish Highlands.

== Biography ==
Cash was born in poverty, in a working class family living in Ladywood, Birmingham, in June 1857. He attended St John's in Ladywood and chose a career in teaching. He attended St Mark's College in Chelsea, London, and then London University. He taught school in Sheffield, and there met Alice Octavia Randell; they married in July 1881 and in 1886 moved to Scotland. For 30 years, he taught music and geography at the Edinburgh Academy, and spent his summers in Aviemore, then a popular holiday resort which gave access to the Cairngorms.

In 1891, he started walking through the hills and climbing the mountains of the Cairngorms (which wasn't to be visited by the Scottish Mountaineering Club until 1902). He joined the Royal Scottish Geographical Society in 1892; he became a fellow in 1895. His first recorded climb in Cairngorm was in August 1894, when he ascended Cairn Toul, followed by many more of Cairngorms' highest peaks, particularly Braeriach, which he climbed a number of times. He published a list of 2000+ ft mountains of the range in 1897, and two years later a list of mountains in Scotland that are visible from the ancient volcano called Arthur’s Seat, near Edinburgh. His publications found praise: Alexander Inkson McConnochie, one of the founders of the Cairngorm Club and the editor of the club journal's first 36 issues, said that Cash had "a familiarity with, and a knowledge of the Cairngorm Mountains almost unequalled". From the early 1890s on, Cash and McConnochie pioneered climbing in the area.

His wife Alice accompanied him on a rare few of his climbs. He makes no mention of her doing so after 1894, although she accompanied him on a walk to view an eagle's nest in 1903 and cycling up Glen Nevis in 1907. She also accompanied him on his tours of chambered cairns and standing stones around Killin and Aberfeldy. Hill-walker Kellan MacInnes suggests, from experience that he characterizes as common to "every mountaineer", that Cash's mention of the "occasional disaster of over late return" in Nights and Days may refer to Alice waiting anxiously at home for his return and being worried when he is late. He further suggests that Cash's experiments with moonlight excursions were perhaps a way of avoiding being away all day from, or late returning to, Alice, saying that "while Sir Hugh Munro sometimes climbed at night to avoid disturbing landowner's sport, Caleb climbed at night to avoid upsetting his wife."

He was interested in the ecology of the land as well, and in 1907 published (privately) an account of the local history of the osprey and their persecution. In an article in The Geographical Teacher in 1904, Cash related one of his ideas for teaching geography: drawing a panorama of the landscape viewed from a point, including all visible mountain peaks, crags, and skylines, and recording angular measurements between them taken with a protractor. He provided an example in the article, a panorama taken from the iron footbridge at Aviemore railway station.

Cash died in August 1917 after a short period of illness. The Edinburgh Academy Chronicle had reported only that summer that he would not be working that term "owing to ill health" and that "we hope a term's rest will enable him to return with renewed vigour in October".

== Publications and research ==
Cash edited books on geography for young readers, including Cook's Voyages and The Story of the North-West Passage. His last book, A Contribution to the Bibliography of Scottish Topography, was published by the Scottish Historical Society in 1917, just months before he died, after he had spent fifteen years researching and writing the matter. He also had an interest in archeology (including menhirs, cairns, and hill forts; he documented these and published on them in, for instance, the journal of the Cairngorm's Club. In 1908 he became a Corresponding Member of the Society of Antiquaries of Scotland.

He is best remembered for his study of the work of Timothy Pont, the 16th-17th c. cartographer, and published the history of his maps in two influential articles in Scottish Geographical Magazine, becoming "perhaps the most influential of Pont's many biographers". His 1901 article in the Scottish Geographical Magazine included a detailed description of Pont's father, the clergyman Robert Pont. Cash preserved the manuscript maps for the Blaeu Atlas of Scotland, some of which had been worked on by Pont between 1583 and 1596; Pont signed 36 of the maps that Joan Blaeu engraved. These manuscripts had "fallen into disarray", and Cash began by preserving them. He described and catalogued them, and collected and reviewed everything that had been written on them, and any material connected to the origin of the manuscripts and the maps as they were printed. Apparently he did such an exhaustive job that for the next fifty years nothing of importance was added. According to historian Jeffrey Stone, "the work of Cash represents a major advance in knowledge of the atlas, a major achievement which was preceded and followed by long periods of lack of either interest or success in scholarly work on the atlas".

He became friends with cartographer Sir Arthur Mitchell in 1901, and assisted Mitchell while he was working on publishing the Macfarlane's Geographical Collections; Mitchell was also his correspondent while Cash worked on what became A Contribution to the Bibliography of Scottish Topography, which incorporated the large collection of notes Mitchell left behind after he died in 1909. Mitchell had simply jotted down notes on scraps of paper torn from unused parts of letters over the years and stored them in what Cash described as a "chaotic multitude" of cardboard boxes. It took Cash a year and a half just to convert Mitchell's notes into a standardized format, and the work of compiling A Contribution occupied very nearly the rest of Cash's life, the next twelve years. His largest work, it eventually ran to some 700 pages in two volumes, the first published in March 1917, and the second in May 1917.

As mentioned in the preface to A Contribution Cash was helped by his brother Albert, someone whom he rarely mentioned in his writings, with obtaining maps from the British Museum in London. Cash himself simply referred to the work as the List and MacInnes notes that Cash's earliest (the "Mountains Visible from Arthur's Seat") and last works were both lists. Cash gave a signed copy of it to the library of the RSGS in June 1917, and as of the 21st century the National Library of Scotland has two copies, one on a reference shelf and one in a reading room, the latter of which, librarians there told MacInnes, they use all of the time in order to answer questions from the general public.

Only 400 copies of A Contribution were printed, and when MacInnes bought a copy from an online bookseller he found that the leaves had not yet been separated, indicating that it had not been read in the century since its publication.

Cash's papers appear not to have survived, but five copies of the Blaeu Atlas of Scotland did — books given by Joan Blaeu to Robert Gordon of Straloch, which Cash apparently bought cheaply at an estate sale. They are held in the library of Aberdeen University.

MacInnes's biography of Cash, shortlisted for the Saltire Society's First Book of the Year award in 2013, is part autobiography, part biography of Cash, and part history of the exploration of Scottish hills by climbers, complete with diagrams and illustrations of climbing routes and the like.

=== Selected publications ===
==== Books ====
- Mitchell, Arthur; Cash, Caleb George (1917). A Contribution to the Bibliography of Scottish Topography. Edinburgh: Scottish Historical Society. (Volume 1 at the Internet Archive; Volume 2 at the Internet Archive)

==== Articles ====
- Cash, Caleb George (1901). "The First Topographical Survey of Scotland". Scottish Geographical Magazine. 17 (8): 399–414. doi:10.1080/00369220108733272.
- Cash, Caleb George (February 1904). "How to make a panorama: with a reduction of that from Aviemore station". The Geographical Teacher. 2 (4). Geographical Association: 174–175. JSTOR 40556230.
- Cash, Caleb George (1902). "Nights and Days on the Caingorms". The Cairngorm Club Journal. 3. Cairngorm Club: 317–321.
