= Blaeu Atlas of Scotland =

Atlas of Scotland and Ireland published 1654

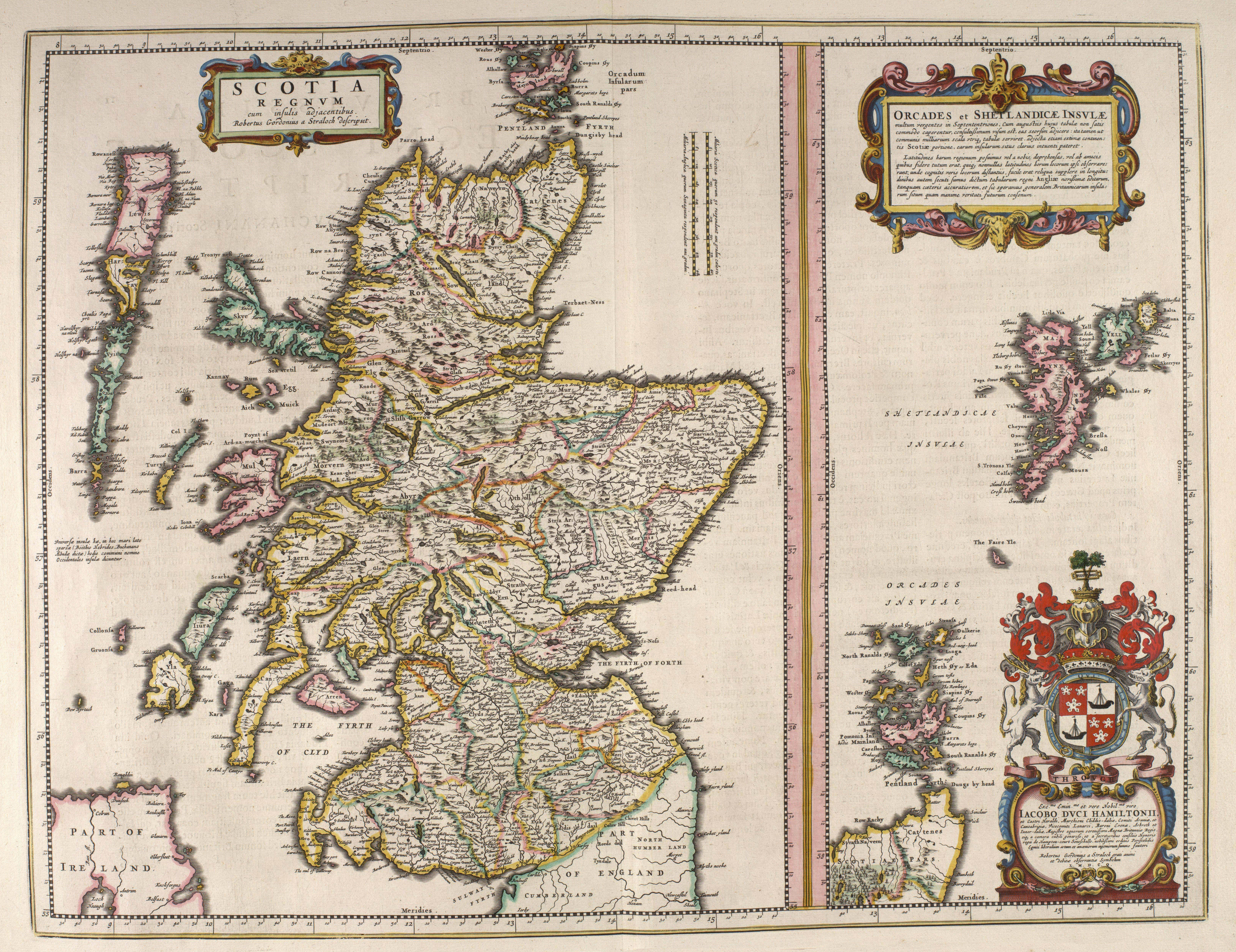
Scotland, Orkney, and Shetland in the Atlas of Scotland

The book commonly known as Blaeu Atlas of Scotland, the fifth volume of Theatrum Orbis Terrarum Sive Atlas Novus, is the first known atlas of Scotland and Ireland. It was compiled by the Dutch cartographer Joan Blaeu, and contains 49 engraved maps and 154 pages of descriptive text written in Latin; it was first published in 1654. Most of the maps were made by Timothy Pont, a Scottish cartographer. Those maps, made between 1583 and 1596, were collected, edited, and augmented with other maps (made by Robert Gordon of Straloch and his son James) by John Scot, Lord Scotstarvit, a Scottish laird.

It is the first known atlas of Scotland, and is praised for its quality and its importance; cartobibliographer Jeffrey Stone said in 1972 that for a century after its publication nothing notable happened in the cartography of Scotland. A translated version, including additional documentation, was published in association with the National Library of Scotland in 2006.

Pont is thought to have done the fieldwork for his maps in the 1580s and the 1590s, but he died before being able to produce his planned version of a Scottish atlas. His maps were eventually acquired and preserved by Sir James Balfour, 1st Baronet, of Denmilne and Kinnaird who passed them to John Scot, Lord Scotstarvit. Scot had learned that his pen pal Blaeu was interested in mapping Scotland, so he sent Pont's maps to him. The book's descriptions for Orkney and Shetland were reportedly written by an anonymous writer from Orkney. The descriptions of other Scottish locations were originally written by George Buchanan and an Englishman named Camden, with a number of corrections provided by Scot. According to the historian and cartobibliographer Jeffrey C. Stone, the Atlas remained the most accurate portrayal of the Scottish landscape until William Roy's military survey of Scotland (1747-1755).

== Description and genesis ==
Blaeu's Atlas of Scotland is ultimately based on the work of Scottish cartographer Timothy Pont, who likely did the fieldwork on which his maps were based in the 1580s and 1590s. Pont never finished the work; he did ask King James VI and I for financial support for an atlas in the 1610s, but he died in 1615, and the project came to naught. Sir James Balfour, 1st Baronet, of Denmilne and Kinnaird, came across Pont's work toward the end of the 1620s and rescued them; he, in turn, passed them on to John Scot, Lord Scotstarvit, from whom Joan Blaeu, working in Amsterdam, received them in the early 1630s. Blaeu had shown interest in mapping Scotland in 1626 in correspondence with Scot, and so Balfour's find proved timely. Around 35 of the Scottish maps came from Pont; others came from Robert Gordon of Straloch and his son James.

Joan Blaeu explains in the preface that the maps of Scotland depended on the work of Pont and that John Scot had been instrumental in transferring those maps ("but much torn and deformed") to Amsterdam. Blaeu organized the maps, and "finishing touches" (corrections and some descriptions) were applied by Robert and James Gordon. Descriptions for Orkney and Shetland were written by someone from Orkney; all others are derived from George Buchanan and an Englishman named Camden (whose descriptions were often corrected by John Scot).

The preface of Volume IV in the series was announced already in 1645, but it was not published until 1654, in Latin, French, and German (earlier volumes of Blaeu's Atlas Maior were published separately in various languages). A Spanish edition was published probably in 1659.

The atlas has 49 maps of Scotland and, despite its common name ("Blaeu Atlas of Scotland"), 6 maps of Ireland. For cartobibliographer Van der Krogt, the Irish maps indicate that Blaeu wasn't interested in an atlas of Scotland per se, and the slow production development (nearly twenty-five years passed between the first communications regarding Scottish maps and the publication of the book) suggests that it was not of great commercial significance to the firm either.

== Later research ==
The atlas is notable for being the first of its kind but also for its quality. According to historian and cartobibliographer Jeffrey C. Stone, "Blaeu's portrayal of the Scottish landscape far exceeded, in both accuracy and content, anything previously published, or indeed anything to follow for more than a hundred years"; Stone argues that the century following its publication saw nothing of importance or quality happen, not until William Roy's military survey of Scotland (1747-1755). Relatively little scholarship was done in connection to the atlas, and nothing of much value happened until the publication in 1841 and 1858 of two sets of manuscripts and correspondence pertaining to the original publication of the atlas, a publication that saved those materials from oblivion. Important work in preserving, cataloguing, and researching the atlas was carried out by Caleb George Cash, an English-born mountaineer and antiquarian who lived and taught in Scotland for most of his life. The manuscript maps had "fallen into disarray", and Cash began by preserving them. Then, he described and catalogued them and collected and reviewed everything that had been written on them, and any material connected to the printed work. Apparently he did such an exhaustive job that for the next fifty years nothing of importance was added.

The 1960s and 1970s saw a resurgence of interest in the atlas, with half a dozen scholars active in publishing on the maps and the associated manuscripts; by that time, facsimiles of some of the maps had been printed by John Bartholomew and Son, of Edinburgh. During that period, in 1967, a new trove of documents was discovered, with seven letters by Willem Blaeu and eight by his son, Joan Blaeu, from between 1626 and 1657 and addressed to John Scot, Lord Scotstarvit, who played an important role in the production and preparation of the atlas. The documents showed that just after 1630 Scot had received maps made by Timothy Pont between 1583 and 1596; Pont signed 36 of the maps that Blaeu engraved. Some of those maps Scot had sent to Amsterdam for Blaeu to see, and some were to be edited by cartographers Robert and James Gordon. They edited and revised the maps in the 1630s and 1640s, half a century after Pont made the maps, which meant that many corrections may have had to be made and that it is difficult to assess who was responsible for which maps.

The atlas was reprinted in 2006, edited by I. C. Cunningham and published with the assistance of the National Library of Scotland Cunningham also provided commentary on the texts. All the maps and texts are translated into English, and it has an introduction by Charles W. J. Withers, as well as a translation of the complete correspondence between Scot and Blaeu. A reviewer praised the "professionalism, innovation, and expertise" of the NLS staff, but criticized the absence of an index for the maps.
