= Thomas Gordon (lawyer) =

American judge

Thomas Burnett Gordon
- Born: 17 April 1652 (some records say 1653); Scotland
- Died: 28 April 1722; New Jersey, U.S.
- Spouse: Helen Riddell/Janet Mudie

Thomas Burnett Gordon (17 April 1652—April 28, 1722) was a Scottish emigrant to the Thirteen Colonies who became Chief Justice of the New Jersey Supreme Court and New Jersey Attorney General for the Province of New Jersey.

== Early life ==
Thomas Burnett Gordon was born in Pitlurg, Scotland, the son of Robert Gordon, 6th Laird of Pitlurg and Catherine Burnett, daughter of Sir Thomas Burnett, 1st Baronet of Leys. Thomas Gordon's grandfather, Robert, 1st Laird of Straloch, was a Scottish geographer, mathematician, and antiquary. His mother's lineage (Catherine Burnett) is, as follows:

Robert III, King of Scotland, d. 1406 = Annabella Drummond; Mary Stewart = George Douglas, 1st Earl of Angus; William Douglas, 2nd Earl of Angus = Margaret Hay; George Douglas, 4th Earl of Angus = Isabel Sibbald; Archibald Douglas, 5th Earl of Angus = Elizabeth Boyd; Sir William Douglas of Glenverbie = Elizabeth Auchinleck; Sir Archibald Douglas of Glenbervie = Agnes Keith; William Douglas, 9th Earl of Angus = Egidia Graham; Sir Robert Douglas of Glenbervie = Elizabeth Auchinleck; Margaret Douglas = Sir Thomas Burnett, 1st Baronet; Catherine Burnett = Robert Gordon of Pitlurg; Thomas Gordon, Chief Justice of N.J. = (1) Helen Riddell; (2) Janet Mudie

Thomas emigrated to America in 1684, settling in the province of East New Jersey. He was a graduate of King's College, Cambridge.

Thomas purchased several hundred acres bounded by Cedar Brook in what is today Plainfield, New Jersey. He erected a wigwam on the property in the late 17th century, and later sold the estate to John Webster, who, in 1717, erected the oldest portions of Cedar Brook Farm, Plainfield's oldest building.

The Gordon family were proprietors of Perth-Amboy, NJ (originally called New Aberdeen in the Jersey Colony). In 1692-1693 he was appointed Deputy Secretary and Register for the East Jersey Proprietors, Clerk of the Court of Common Right, Register of the Court of Chancery, Judge of the Probate Court and a Commissioner to try small cases. On November 10, 1703 he represented the town of Perth Amboy in the first General Assembly of the newly reunited Province of New Jersey and in the same year was appointed Register of the Council of Proprietors of East Jersey.

At the Assembly of 5 May 1708 he was elected Speaker in place of Samuel Jennings, who was indisposed. On 28 April 1709 he was made Chief Justice of New Jersey by Governor John Lovelace, but within a few months was appointed Receiver General of the Province, holding the post until 1719. He was also appointed Attorney General (January 22, 1714) and a member of the Council by Governor Robert Hunter, in which latter position he served until 1722.

== Personal life ==
He married twice; firstly Helen and secondly Janet Mudie, the daughter of David Mudie of Perth Amboy. He had children with both wives. but none of the children from his first marriage survived childhood.

== Death ==
He died in 1722 and is buried in St. Peter's Churchyard, Perth Amboy, NJ. The church property was deeded by Thomas B. Gordon to the parish. "A new and beautiful House of God had been erected which stood from 1721 until 1850 or for a period of nearly one hundred and thirty years. It was the second place of worship for the churchmen of Perth Amboy, but the first to occupy the present church site taking the place of the converted Court House given by the Colonial Proprietors and situated on the Long Ferry property-now known as Caledonian Park. The parish had become incorporated just four years earlier receiving its charter from King George I. The old corner stone bearing the date 1685, the oldest historic relic of Perth Amboy now built into the chancel wall of the church, was originally probably the stone in the stone grist mill of David Mudie which was on the same site with the present church. David Mudie was the father in-law of Thomas Gordon and Thomas Gordon, inheriting this property through his wife, afterward deeded it to the church for a church building and for a burying ground." (source: http://skinnerkinsmen.org/wood06/D0005/I404.html)
