= David Ellis (botanist) =

Scottish botanist (1874–1937)

Prof David Ellis FRSE (1874–1937) was a Scottish bacteriologist, botanist and baker. He was an academic author in all three fields.

== Life ==
He was born in Aberystwyth in north Wales on 9 June 1874. He attended the University College of Wales 1890-96. From 1896 to 1898 he was Science Master at the County School in Aberystwyth. He then went to the University of London gaining a doctorate (DSc) before going to Marburg University where he gained a second doctorate (PhD). In 1904 he became a Lecturer in Botany and Bacteriology at the West of Scotland Technical College. He married Jeannie Wright Paulin in Muckhart in 1906, and the same year he was elected a Fellow of the Royal Society of Edinburgh. His proposers were Sir David Paulin, George Alexander Gibson, Sir Arthur Mitchell and James Chatham.

In later life he lived at 10 Spring Gardens in Kelvinside in Glasgow.

In 1920 he became Superintendent of the Scottish School of Bakery, and from 1925 until death was Professor of Bacteriology at the Royal Technical College, Glasgow. In December 1925 he appears to have made an early radio broadcast entitled "Why we Attribute Life to Plants".

He died in Bearsden in Glasgow on 16 January 1937.

== Publications ==
The standard author abbreviation D.Ellis is used to indicate this person as the author when citing a botanical name.

- On the Discovery of a New Genus of Thread-Bacteria (1907)
- Outlines of Bacteriology: Technical and Agricultural (1909)
- Herbal Medicines and Poisonous Plants (1918)
- Guide to Common Wild Flowers of the West of Scotland (1925)
- Guide to Common Wild Flowers in Wales (1925)
- The Science and Practice of Confectionery (1928)
