= Atlas van Loon =

17th Century Atlas

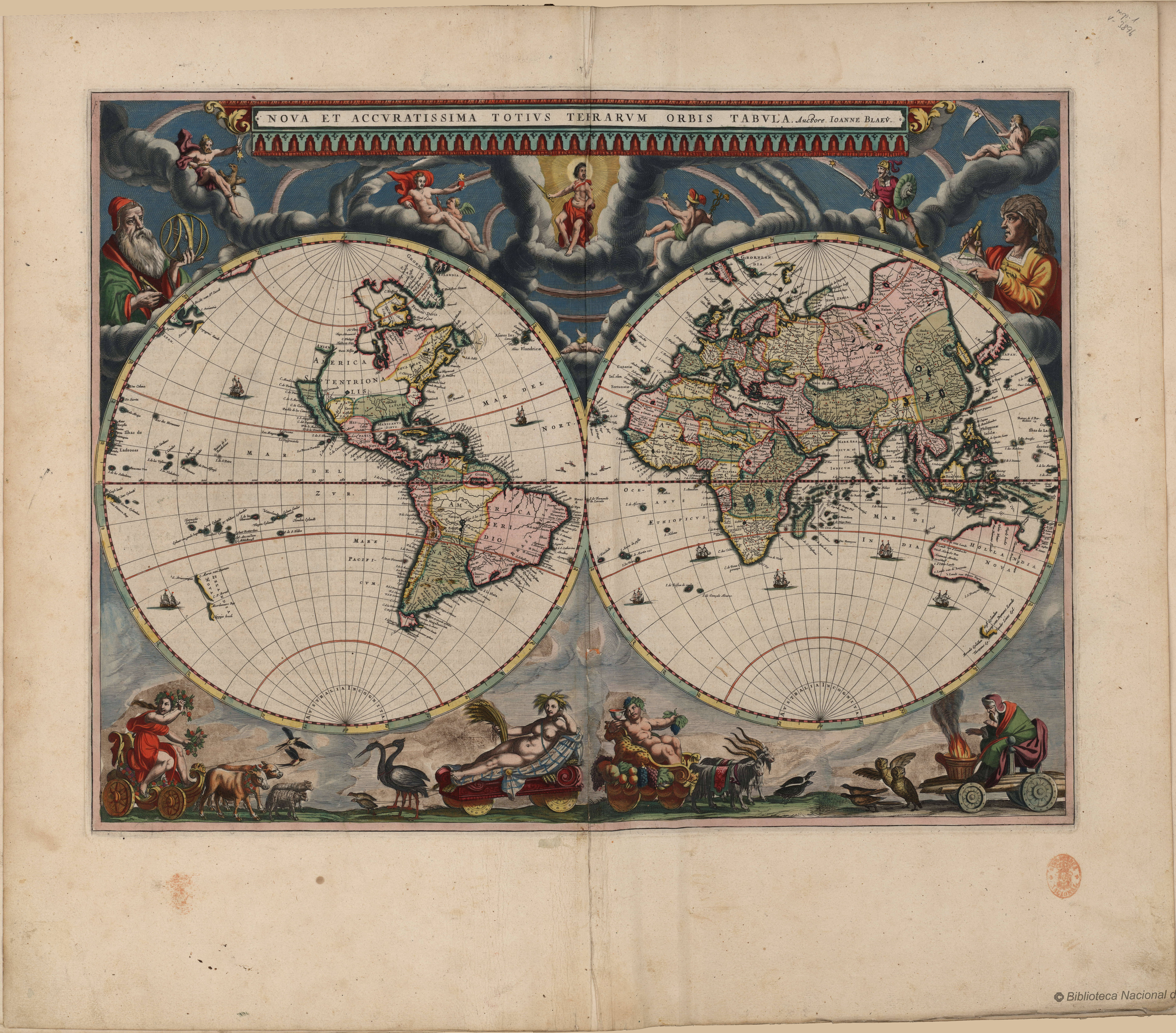
Blaeu's world map, first published in the 1664 volume of the Atlas van Loon, later reprinted

The Atlas van Loon was commissioned by Frederik Willem van Loon of Amsterdam. It consists of a large number of maps published between 1649 and 1676:

The works includes both maritime atlases and country-specific maps which cover in detail areas of the Italian Peninsula (including Sicily), the Kingdom of France, the Old Swiss Confederacy, the Dutch Republic, and the Spanish Netherlands.

== Contents ==
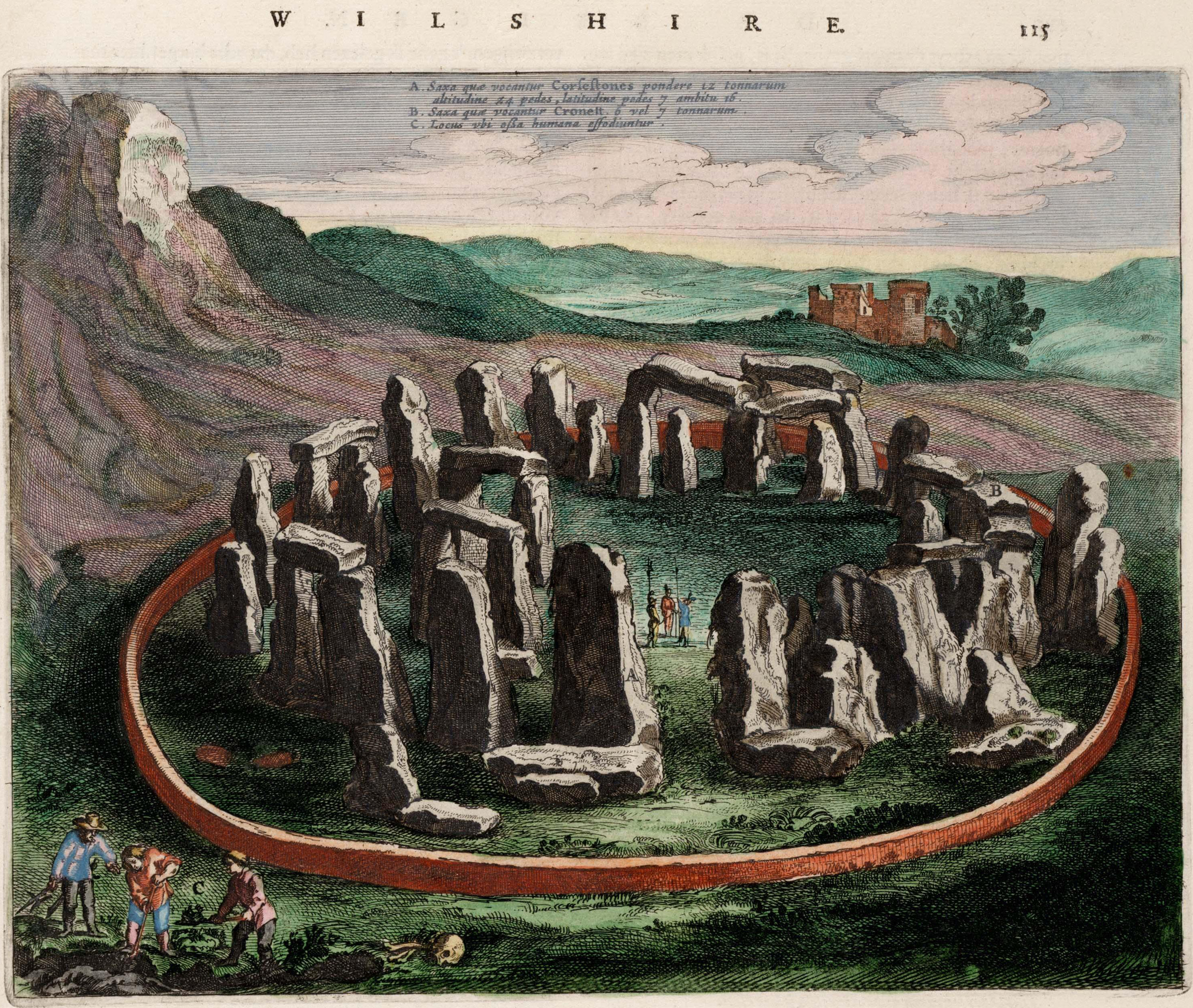
17th-century depiction of Stonehenge from the Atlas van Loon

- Volumes I to IX: The Dutch edition of Joan Blaeu's Atlas Maior (Grooten Atlas) of 1663-1665
- Volumes X, XI and XII: Blaeu's city books of Italy, covering the Papal States, Rome, Naples, and Sicily, all of 1663.
- Volumes XIII and XIV: Two volumes of the French edition of Blaeu's Atlas Maior, covering France and Switzerland, both of 1663.
- Volumes XV and XVI: Blaeu's Toonneel der Steeden, city books covering both the Northern and the Southern Netherlands, of 1649
- Volume XVII: Pieter Goos's Zee-atlas ofte water-wereld (Maritime Atlas or Water World) of 1676
- Volume XVIII: The French edition of Johannes Janssonius's Zeeatlas (Maritime Atlas) of 1657

The Atlas van Loon was acquired by the Nederlands Scheepvaartmuseum in 1996.

== See also ==
- History of cartography
- Cartography
- Ancient maps
- Willem Blaeu
