= Atlas Maior =

Atlas by Joan Blaeu

- Language: Latin; French; Dutch; German; Spanish
- Genre: atlas
- Published: 1662 to 1672
- Publisher: Joan Blaeu

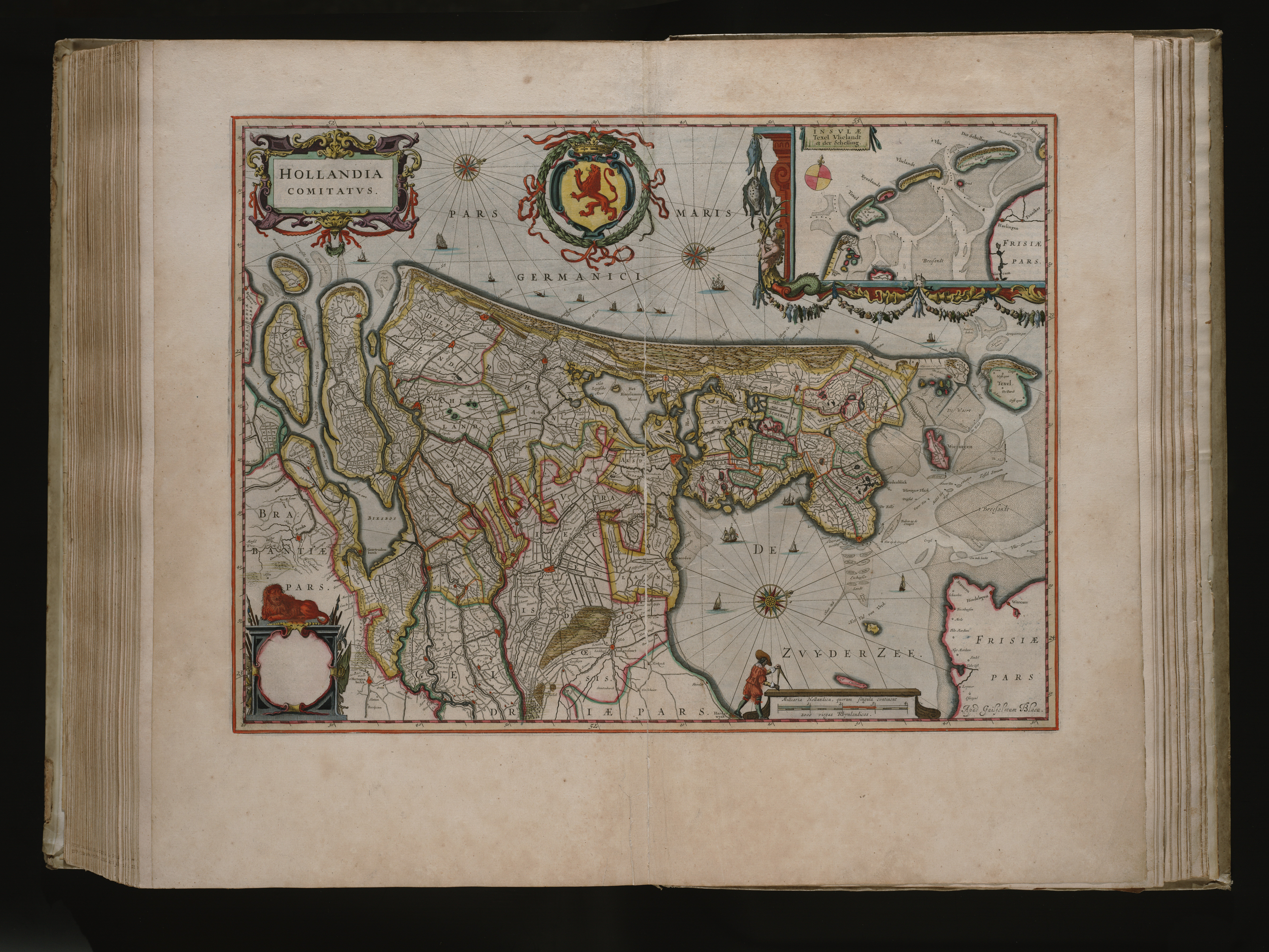
Atlas Blaeu - Erfgoed Leiden en Omstreken

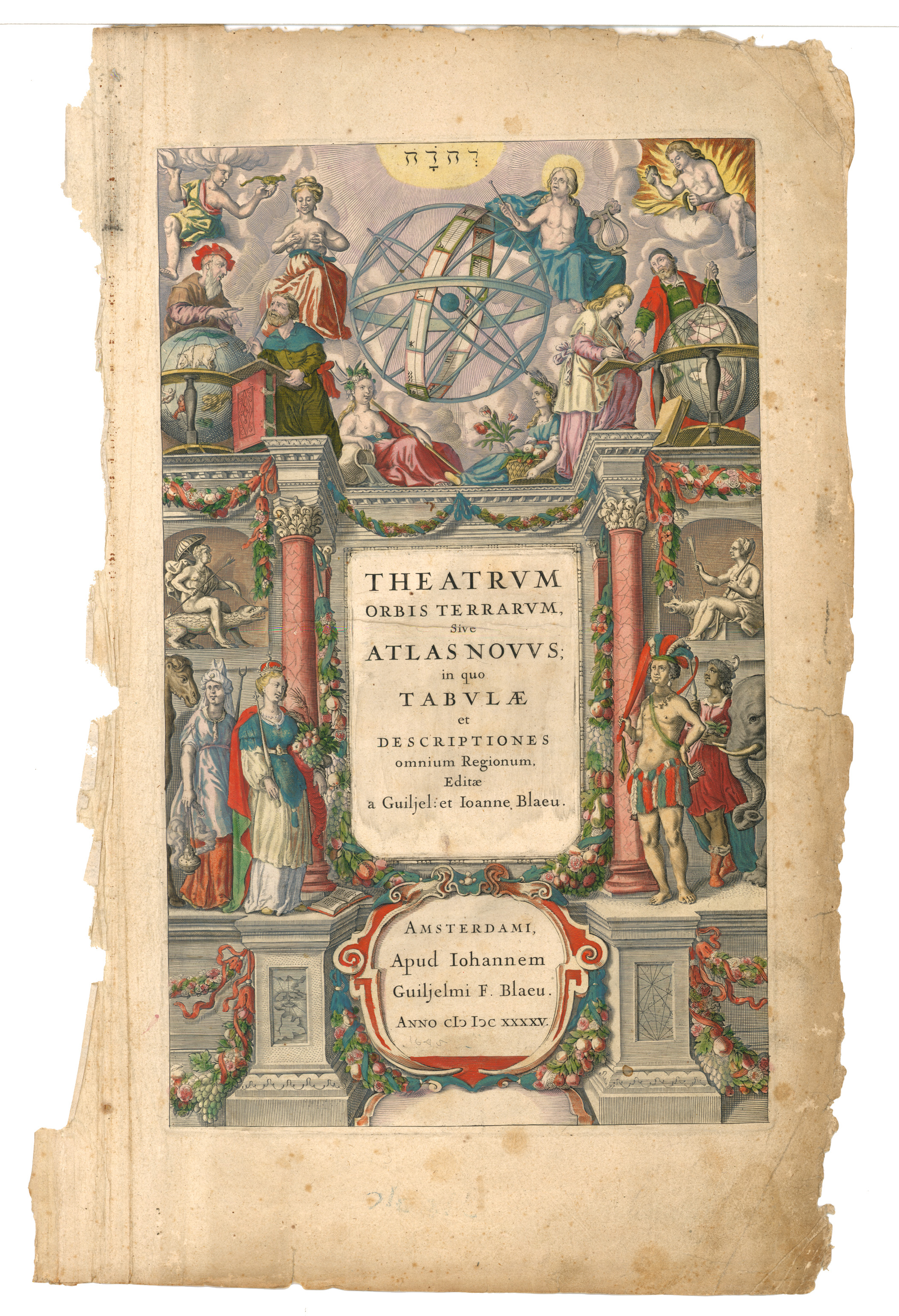
Front page of the Atlas novus, forerunner of the Atlas maior, 1645

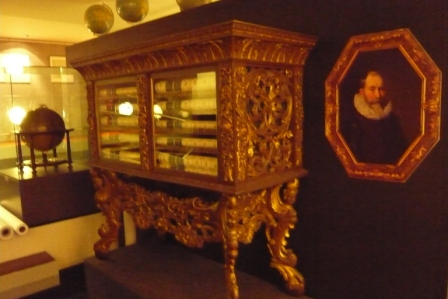
Joan & Willem Blaeu Atlas in 11 volumes with white leather binding with gold leaf and special chest to hold it in, next to a portrait of Willem Blaeu, copy in the University of Amsterdam Special Collections

The Atlas Maior is a seventeenth-century multi-volume atlas produced by the Dutch cartographer and publisher Joan Blaeu, issued in Amsterdam between 1662 and 1672. It represents the final and most extensive version of Blaeu’s atlas project, building on earlier works such as the Atlas Novus.

Published in several language editions, including Latin, French, Dutch, German, and Spanish, the atlas comprises a large collection of maps with accompanying descriptive text, presenting a geographical account of the known world. It was conceived as part of a broader cosmographical project, although only the section describing the land was completed.

The Atlas Maior is widely regarded as one of the most ambitious and elaborate atlases of the seventeenth century and is often considered a major work of the Dutch Golden Age of cartography.

== Description ==
The Atlas Maior is the final version of Joan Blaeu's atlas, published in Amsterdam between 1662 and 1672, in Latin (11 volumes), French (12 volumes), Dutch (9 volumes), German (10 volumes) and Spanish (10 volumes), containing 594 maps and around 3,000 pages of text. It was the largest and most expensive book published in the seventeenth century. Earlier, much smaller versions, titled Theatrum Orbis Terrarum, sive, Atlas Novus, were published from 1634 onwards.

== History ==
Somewhere around 1604 Willem Blaeu settled down in Amsterdam and opened a shop on the Damrak, where he produced and sold scientific instruments, globes and maps. He was also a publisher, editor and engraver.

In 1629, Willem Blaeu bought the copperplates of several dozens of maps from Jodocus Hondius II's widow. Afterwards, he published an Atlantis Appendix to Mercator's atlas in 1630, containing 60 maps, but no text. The next year a new edition was published, with 98 maps and descriptive text in Latin.

Willem and his son Joan Blaeu made a public announcement in an Amsterdam newspaper that they would publish their own full atlas in 1634. Their first atlas was completed in 1635 and appeared in four different versions: Novus Atlas (German edition, 208 maps in two volumes), Theatrum Orbis Terrarum, sive, Atlas Novus (Latin edition, 207 maps in two volumes; title refers to Ortelius' Theatrum Orbis Terrarum), Toonneel des Aerdrycks (Dutch edition, also 207 maps in two volumes) and finally Theatre du Monde ou Nouvel Atlas (French edition, 208 maps in two volumes (like the German edition)).

After his father's death in 1638, Joan continued to rework and expand the atlas. A three volume edition was published from 1640 onwards. Joan later published the Atlas of England (1648) with maps of John Speed, the Atlas of Scotland (1654) with maps of Timothy Pont and Robert Gordon, and Martino Martini's Novus Atlas Sinensis (Atlas of China, 1655), which were added as respectively the fourth, fifth and sixth volumes of Blaeu's Atlas Novus.

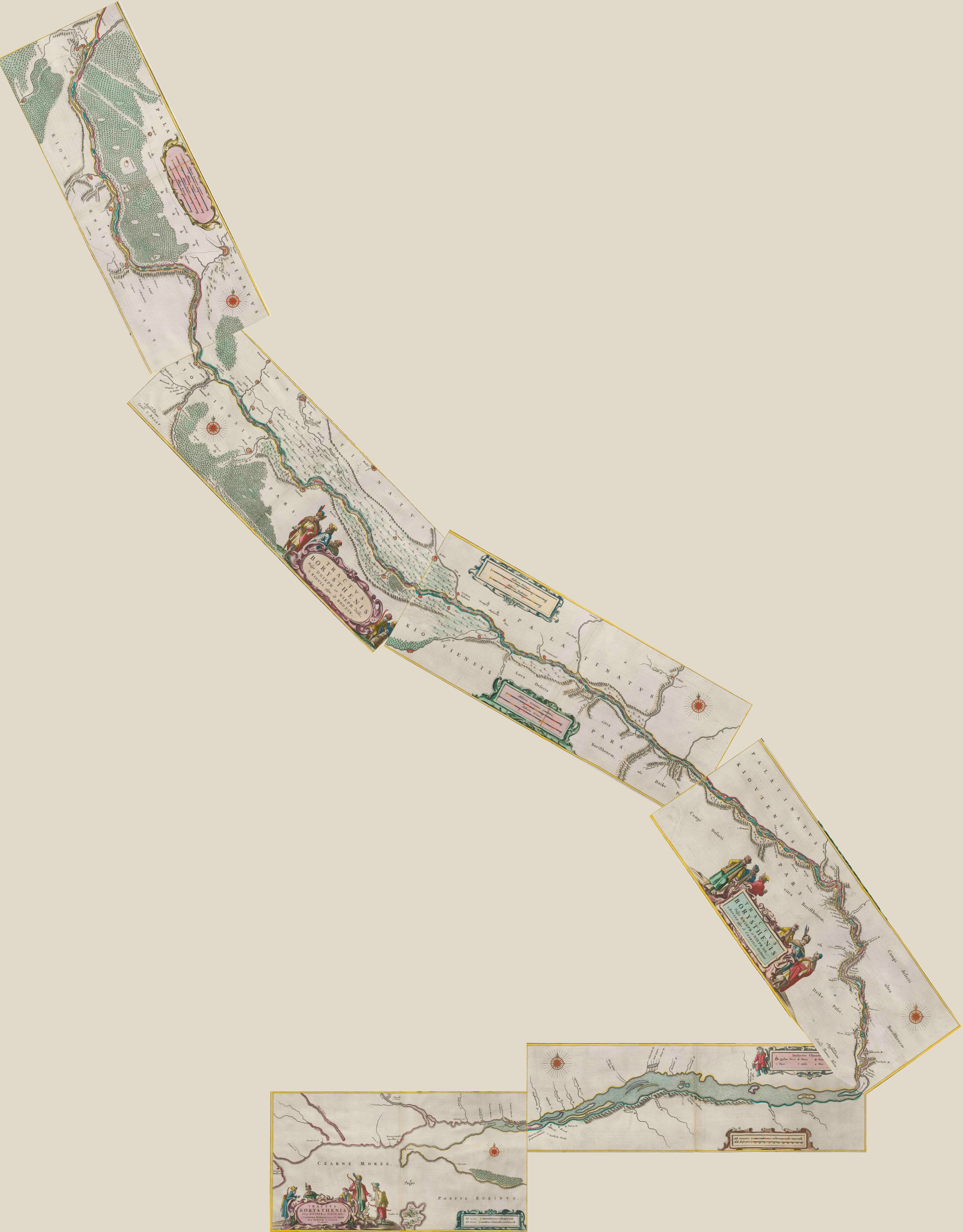
Map of the river Borysthenes (Dnipro) in the 1664 Dutch Atlas Maior edition, drawn by Guillaume Le Vasseur de Beauplan.

The final version of the atlas was published as the Atlas Maior and contained 594 maps in eleven (Latin edition: Geographia qvæ est cosmographiæ Blavianæ), twelve (French edition: Le grand atlas ou Cosmographie blaviane, en laquelle est exactement descritte la terre, la mer et le ciel), nine (Dutch edition: Grooten atlas, oft werelt-beschryving, in welcke 't aertryck, de zee en hemel wordt vertoont en beschreven) or ten (German edition) volumes. This final version of the Atlas Maior was the largest and most expensive book published in the seventeenth century.

The first volumes were published in 1662, the last volume was finished in 1665, although Joan continued to rework several volumes. All of them reused the text of the 1651 edition of Beauplan's Description of Ukraine, which he titled Description of the Borysthenes, commonly called Dnieper, and the Ethics of the Zaporozhian Cossacks, which considerably stimulated Western European knowledge of and interest in Ukraine. He also started creating a 12 volume Spanish edition, however, only 10 volumes were finished.

However, this 9 to 12 volume atlas was only intended to be the first part of a much larger work, which is illustrated by the full title of the atlas: Atlas Maior, sive Cosmographia Blaviana, qua solum, salum, coelum, accuratissime describuntur (Grand Atlas or Blaeu's Cosmography, in which are most accurately described earth, sea, and heaven). The second part (about the coasts, seas and oceans) and third part (with maps of the skies) were never produced.

In 1672, fire broke out in the workshop. Joan Blaeu died the next year. No new editions of his atlases were published and the family business went bankrupt within a few years.

== Literature ==
General and introductory works:

- Walter A. Goffart, Historical Atlases: The First Three Hundred Years, 1570-1870. University of Chicago Press, 2003, ISBN 0-226-30071-4. (in English)
- John Goss & Peter Clark, Blaeu – Der große Atlas: die Welt im 17. Jahrhundert. Wien 1990, ISBN 3-701-40304-X (in German)
- J. Keuning, Willem Jansz. Blaeu. A biography and history of his work as a cartographer and publisher. Rev. and ed. by M. Donkersloot-De Vrij. Amsterdam 1973 (in English)
- C. Koeman, Joan Blaeu and his 'Grand atlas'. Amsterdam 1970. (in English)
- Ute Schneider, Die Macht der Karten. Eine Geschichte der Kartographie vom Mittelalter bis heute. Primus Verlag, 2004, ISBN 3-89678-243-6. (in German)
- R. Shirley, The mapping of the world. Early printed world maps, 1472-1700. London 1983 (in English)
- F. Wawrik, Berühmte Atlanten. Kartographische Kunst aus fünf Jahrhunderten. Dortmund 1982 (in German)
- Jeroen Bos (ed) Beyond the Map: Descriptions of the non-European World in Joan Blaeu’s Atlas Maior (2024, Dutch and English)

Bibliographical descriptions of the atlases:

- Peter van der Krogt (2000), Koeman's Atlantes Neerlandici II: The Folio Atlases Published by Willem Jansz. Blaeu and Joan Blaeu, Houten: Hes & De Graaf publishers BV, ISBN 90-6194-438-4 (in English)

Modern reproductions:

- Joan Blaeu, Le grand atlas ou Cosmographie blaviane, en laquelle est exactement descritte la terre, la mer et le ciel (1663), 12 volumes. The third centenary ed. Amsterdam 1967-1968 (in French)
- Taschen editions based on the Atlas Blaeu-Van der Hem of the Österreichische Nationalbibliothek, Vienna:
  - Peter van der Krogt, Joan Blaeu (2005). Atlas Maior of 1665. Cologne: Taschen Verlag. ISBN 3-8228-3125-5. (in German, French, and English)
  - Peter van der Krogt, Joan Blaeu (2005). Atlas Maior of 1665. Cologne: Taschen Verlag. ISBN 3-8228-4680-5. (in English, Dutch, and French)
  - Peter van der Krogt, Joan Blaeu (2005). Atlas Maior of 1665. Cologne: Taschen Verlag. ISBN 3-8228-4155-2. (in Italian, Spanish, and Portuguese)
  - Peter van der Krogt, Joan Blaeu (2006). Atlas Maior of 1665. New York: Barnes & Noble. ISBN 978-0-7607-8206-4. (in English)
  - Peter van der Krogt, Joan Blaeu (2006). Atlas Maior of 1665 - Germania, Austria & Helvetia, 2 vol. Cologne: Taschen Verlag. ISBN 3822851027. (in German, English, and French)
  - Peter van der Krogt, Joan Blaeu (2006). Atlas Maior of 1665 - Belgica Regia & Belgica Foederata. Cologne: Taschen Verlag. ISBN 3822851035. (in Dutch, French, and English)
  - Peter van der Krogt, Joan Blaeu (2006). Atlas Maior of 1665 - Anglia, Scotia & Hibernia, 2 vol. Cologne: Taschen Verlag. ISBN 3822851043. (in English, French, and German)
  - Peter van der Krogt, Joan Blaeu (2006). Atlas Maior of 1665 - Gallia. Cologne: Taschen Verlag. ISBN 3822851051. (in French, English, and German)
  - Peter van der Krogt, Joan Blaeu (2006). Atlas Maior of 1665 - Italia. Cologne: Taschen Verlag. ISBN 3822851078. (in Italian, English, and German)
  - Peter van der Krogt, Joan Blaeu (2006). Atlas Maior of 1665 - Hispania, Portugallia, America & Africa. Cologne: Taschen Verlag. ISBN 382285106X. (in Spanish, English, and Portuguese)
  - Peter van der Krogt, Joan Blaeu (2010). Atlas Maior of 1665 - Belgica Regia & Belgica Foederata. Kerkdriel: Librero. ISBN 978-90-8998-041-0. (in Dutch, French, and English)
  - Peter van der Krogt, Joan Blaeu (2010). Atlas Maior of 1665. Cologne: Taschen Verlag. ISBN 978-3-8365-2411-7. (in German, French, and English)
  - Peter van der Krogt, Joan Blaeu (2010). Atlas Maior of 1665. Cologne: Taschen Verlag. ISBN 978-3-8365-2413-1. (in English, Dutch, and French)
  - Peter van der Krogt, Joan Blaeu (2010). Atlas Maior of 1665. Cologne: Taschen Verlag. ISBN 978-3-8365-2412-4. (in Italian, Spanish, and Portuguese)

== See also ==
- Atlas Blaeu-Van der Hem
- Atlas Van Loon
- Jan Janssonius
- Maris Pacifici
- History of cartography
- Mappa Mundi
- Golden Age of Netherlandish cartography (also known as the Golden Age of Dutch cartography)
