= Description of Ukraine =

17th-century book about Ukraine by Beauplan

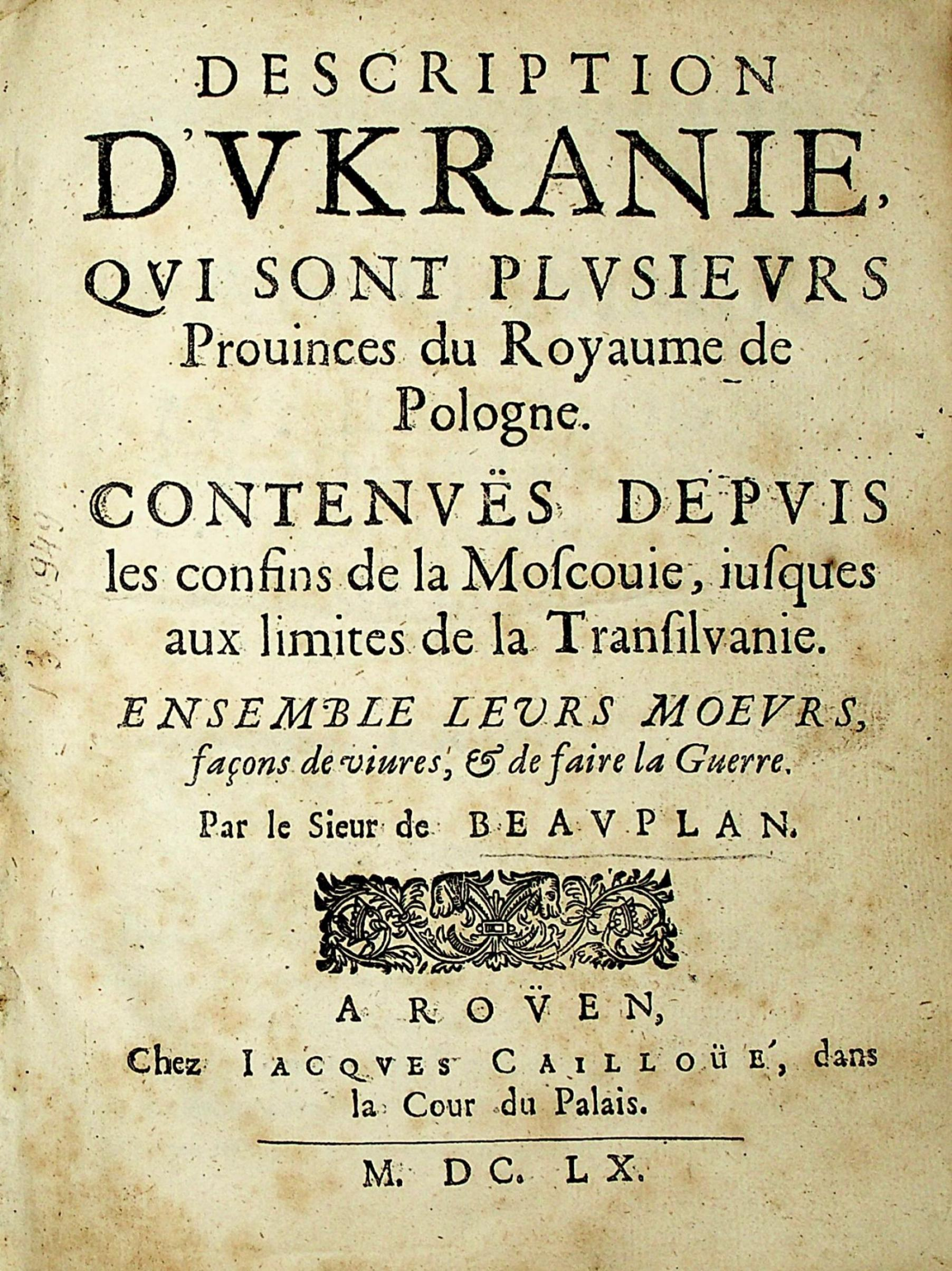
- Title page of Description d'Ukranie (1660).
- Author: Guillaume Le Vasseur de Beauplan
- Original title: Description d'Ukranie
- Language: Early modern French
- Subject: Early modern Ukraine
- Genre: Human geography, Ukrainian studies
- Publisher: Jacques Cailloué
- Publication date: 1651: Description des contrés du Royaume de Pologne; 1660: Description d'Ukranie
- English publication date: Churchill (London 1704)
- Media type: Print
- Pages: 112
- Preceded by: General Map of Ukraine

The Description of Ukraine, (Note: Full title of the 1704 English translation: A Description of Ukraine, Containing several Provinces of the Kingdom of Poland, Lying between the Confines of Muscovy, and the Borders of Transylvania. Together with their Customs, Manner of Life, and how they manage their Wars. Written in French by the Sieur de Beauplan.) in its original French second-edition title Description d'Ukranie (Note: Full title of the 1660 second edition in early modern French: Description d'Ukranie, qvi sont plvsievrs Prouinces du Royaume de Pologne, Contenvës depvis les confins de la Moscouie, iusques aux limites de la Transilvanie. Ensemble levrs moevrs, facons de viures, & de faire la Guerre. Par le Sieur de Beavplan. A Roüen, Chez Iacqves Cailloüé, dans la Cour du Palais, 'Description of Ukraine, which are several Provinces of the Kingdom of Poland, Contained from the borders of Muscovy, up to the limits of Transylvania. Together, their thoughts, ways of living, and waging War. By Sir de Beauplan. In Rouen, at Jacques Cailloüé, in the Palace Courtyard').) (Ukrainian: «Опис України», romanized: Opys Ukrajiny), is a book written by the French engineer and military cartographer Guillaume Le Vasseur de Beauplan, who served the Polish king Władysław IV Vasa from the early 1630s to 1648.

The original 1651 edition of the book (without "Ukraine" in the title yet) covered the city of Kiev, the Cossacks (in two chapters), Ukraine's nobility and its peasants, other cities and environs of the region, the peninsula of Crimea and the Crimean Tatars. Also depicted were the local customs, medicine, and fauna. The revised and expanded edition of 1660 additionally covered the climate of Ukraine and the Easter celebrations in the region. Also included was an expanded description of Poland, with an emphasis on the Polish nobility and the Polish military equipment. The revised edition was dedicated to John II Casimir Vasa. At least 26 editions of the book (in at least nine different languages) were published from 1651 to 1981.

The importance of this work lies in the discovery of Ukrainian lands, their identity and history for science and the general public in (Western) Europe. For the first time, Guillaume de Beauplan described Ukrainian life, as well as the life of the ordinary population of the Polish–Lithuanian Commonwealth. Beauplan presented the Cossacks as a phenomenon of the revival of chivalry in the Ukrainian lands, in contrast to the Polish propaganda of the time.

== History of writing and publishing ==
=== Beauplan's background ===
Starting a new service in the Polish Crown Army as a military engineer, Beauplan was engaged in the construction and reconstruction of fortifications in the 1630s, and the foundation of new cities in the south-southeastern areas of the Polish Crown from Kamianets to Kodak fortress, and constantly studied and mapped the surrounding areas. A successful start and a number of merits in the service of the Polish king could not go unnoticed. On 8 March 1637, Beauplan became a courtier of King Władysław IV. On 10 March 1645, he received the royal privilege to publish his maps, and before that he was promoted to the rank of captain of the artillery. After his draft map Tabula Geographica Ukrainska (1639), Beauplan produced a General Map of Ukraine in 1648, and a Special Map of Ukraine in 1650.

=== Composition of the original 1651 edition ===
After returning to France, owing to the general interest in the subject of the Cossack wars, Guillaume Le Vasseur de Beauplan published, in a print run of one hundred copies, a small work entitled Description des contrées du royaume de Pologne, contenues depuis les confins de la Moscovie, jusques aux limites de la Transylvanie (Description of the Regions of the Kingdom of Poland, extending from the borders of Muscovy to the frontiers of Transylvania; Rouen 1651). Despite the small circulation, the book was a success. Especially because the book appeared shortly after the famous Battle of Berestechko (28 June – 10 July 1651), in which Polish troops defeated their Cossack and Tatar opponents.

Essar & Pernal (1990) found that the original 1651 edition had two parts: introductory materials and Ukraine. Part 2 about Ukraine discussed the following topics: Kiev, the Cossacks (in two chapters), nobles, peasants, other cities and environs, Crimea and the Crimean Tatars, customs, medicine, fauna, and a conclusion. The text of the first edition, published in Rouen in 1651, was repeated by the Amsterdam-based Dutch cartographer and scientist Joan Blaeu in several editions of his excellent Atlas Maior, appearing in Latin (1662), French (1663 and 1667), Dutch (1664), and Spanish (1665, 1672). However, Blaeu's choice seems to be an exception to the rule, as all other publishers and translators have favoured the longer 1660 version.

Due to a wide range of issues (Note: Including but not limited to: Beauplan being fired from military service by hetman Mikołaj Potocki in 1647 for unknown reasons; the death of king Władysław IV Vasa in 1648; Beauplan's travels and personal life (including his temporary stay in the West Indies in 1652 or 1653, possibly because of religious persecution in France for being a Huguenot); production issues and the death of his engraver Willem Hondius in Danzig in 1653; the confiscation of all materials by the new king John II Casimir Vasa and the expiration of Beauplan's royal privilege to publish the maps in 1654; and all of Hondius' blueprints and copies of the maps being lost during the Swedish Deluge in Danzig in 1655.) no maps made it into the first print of Beauplan's book. Beauplan three times refers to the attached map, but in fact, there is no map in this 1651 edition. In all secondary editions of the Description published by Beauplan in Rouen between 1660 and 1673, only versions of the General Map of Ukraine were included, not the Special Map of Ukraine.

=== Revised edition 1660 ===
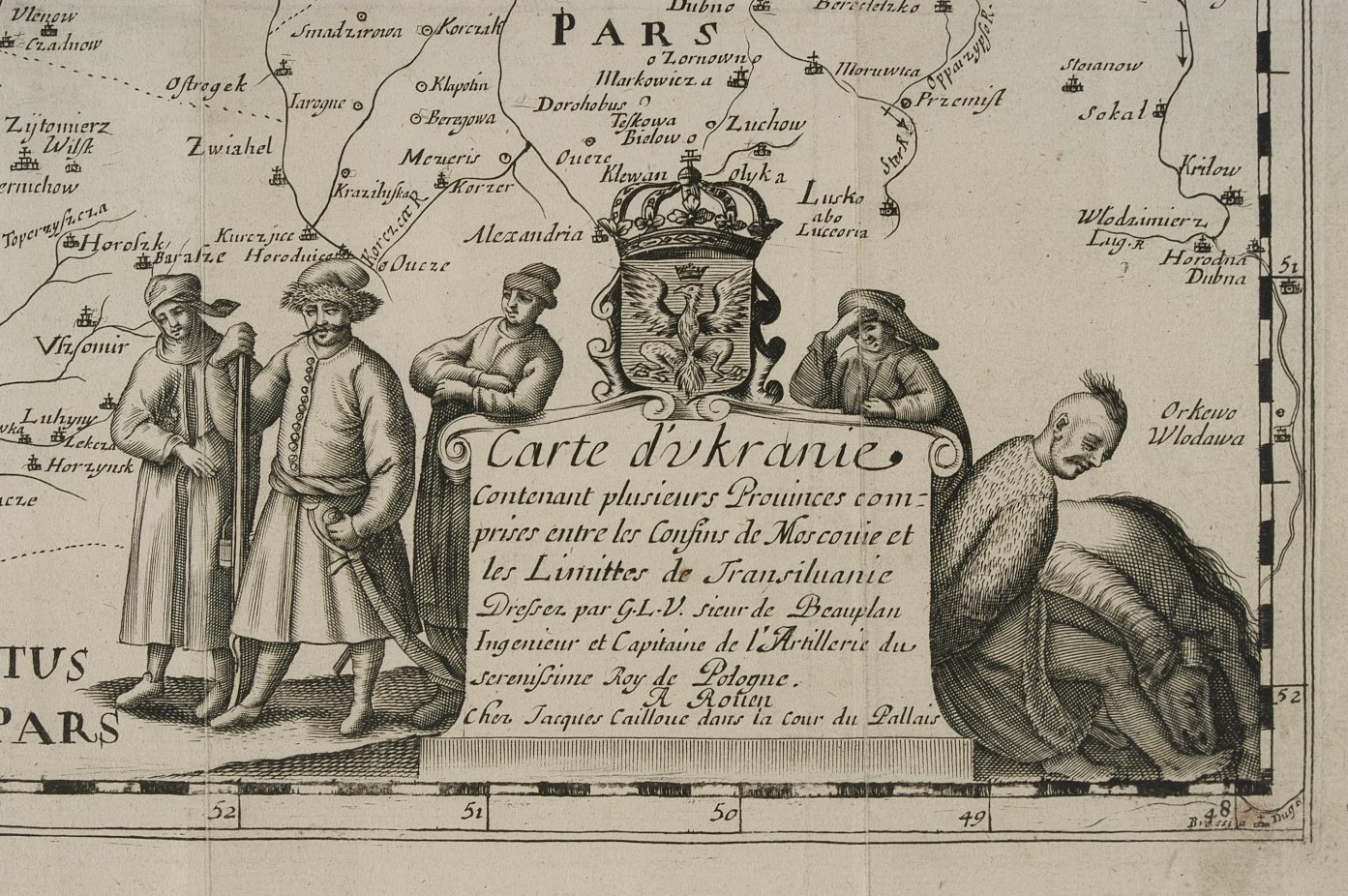
Depiction of Cossacks. Detail of the General Map of Ukraine (1648), Beauplan's earlier work.

The success of the first edition of the Description and the constant unrest in the Ukrainian lands encouraged Beauplan and his publisher Jacques Caillou to publish a new second, revised edition of the work in 1660 with an expanded text and the renamed title Description d’Ukranie, qui sont plusieurs provinces du royaume de Pologne, contenues depuis les confins de la Moscovie, jusques aux limites de la Transylvanie. Ensemble leurs moeurs, facons de viures, et de faire la Guerre (Description of Ukraine, which comprises several provinces of the Kingdom of Poland, stretching from the borders of Muscovy to the frontiers of Transylvania, along with their customs, ways of life, and methods of waging war., Rouen 1660).

The revised and expanded edition of 1660 had three parts: part 1 had slightly different introductory materials (8 pages); part 2 was about Ukraine (88.5 pages), with added chapters about climate and Easter celebrations; and a new part 3 was added about Poland (24.5 pages, about royal institutions; the Polish nobility; military equipment; banquets; and a conclusion). This edition actually contains the full text of the 1651 edition with a description of Poland itself, a dedication to king John II Casimir Vasa, and a 'Word to the Reader'. The text of the 1660 edition was repeated in the version published in Rouen in 1661. The book became the best-known and most frequently re-edited and translated 17th-century source that provided a geographical, economic, cultural, societal and demographic description of Ukraine. At least 26 editions in at least nine different languages were published from 1651 to 1981. It has seen ongoing prints ever since.

In a 5 October 1662 letter, Dutch scientist Christiaan Huygens said he had seen Isaac Vossius's copy of "Description d'Ukranie by Sir Beauplan", and asked his brother Lodewijck Huygens to send him a copy from a bookshop in Paris, and recommended Lodewijck to buy another copy for himself "for your own curiousity, because it contains remarkable things, such as on page 80 and elsewhere", referring to a description of Bobaques (a kind of marmot). In letters from 19 October and 1 December 1662, Huygens thanked his brother for sending him a copy of the Description of Ukraine.

The first known information about a copy of the Description d'Ukranie in Ukraine itself dates back to the early 19th century. The book was kept in Yahotyn in the library of Prince Mykola Repin (1778–1845), governor-general of Little Russia and amateur historian. There were few known French originals of the Description in Russia and Ukraine; in the second half of the 19th century, one or two copies in Saint Petersburg and Moscow, one copy in Kiev, Odesa, and Lviv.

=== Editions of the Description of Ukraine ===
Essar & Pernal (1982) found the following 26 editions of Beauplan's Description of Ukraine, including the original 1651 edition and versions of it. These may be divided in two groups: the original 1651 edition, and its derivatives (all part of Joan Blaeu's Atlas Maior); and the 1660 revised and expanded edition, and its derivatives.

1. Beauplan: Rouen 1651 (French)
2. Blaeu: Amsterdam 1662 (Latin)
3. Blaeu: Amsterdam 1663 (French)
4. Blaeu: Amsterdam 1664 (Dutch)
5. Blaeu: Amsterdam 1665 (Spanish)
6. Blaeu: Amsterdam 1667 (French)
7. Blaeu: Amsterdam 1672 (Spanish)
8. Blaeu: Amsterdam 1967 (French)
1. Beauplan: Rouen 1660 (French)
2. Beauplan: Rouen 1661 (French)
3. Beauplan: Rouen 1673 (French)
4. Churchill: London 1704 (English)
5. Churchill: London 1732 (English)
6. Churchill: London 1744 (English)
7. Churchill: London 1752 (English)
8. Mizler von Kolof: Warsaw 1769 (Latin)
9. Moeller: Wrocław 1780 (German)
10. Niemcewicz: Warsaw 1822 (Polish)
11. Ustrialov: St. Petersburg 1832 (Russian)
12. Niemcewicz: Leipzig 1839 (Polish)
13. Galitzin: Paris 1861 (French)
14. Antonovich: Kiev 1896 (Russian)
15. Liaskoronskii: Kiev 1901 (Russian)
16. Petryshyn: New York 1959 (English)
17. Wójcik: Warsaw 1972 (Polish)
18. Isaievych: Lviv 1981 (Ukrainian)

The 1780 German translation, published by the printing house of Wilhelm-Gotlieb Korn in Wrocław, was commissoned by the Kyiv-Mohyla Academy, and carried out by Johann Wilhelm Moeller (Möller), who was interested in the history and geography of Ukraine, travelled there several times (including in 1780, the same year he published his translation), and included meaningful footnotes about his travels in his edition. In 1925, excerpts about the Dnieper rapids from the Description of Ukraine were translated into Ukrainian by Bohdan Barvinsky, and were published in Lviv in the Ukrainian popular science book Історична бібліотека «Просвіти» (Historical Library "Enlightenment"). In 1990, a full modern Ukrainian translation was published in Kyiv, along with a full transcript of the 1660 second edition in French; both were digitised and published online at the Izbornyk digital library in 2001. A modern English translation of A Description of Ukraine with an introduction and annotations was published by Essar & Pernal in Cambridge, Massachusetts in 1993.

== Contents of the work ==
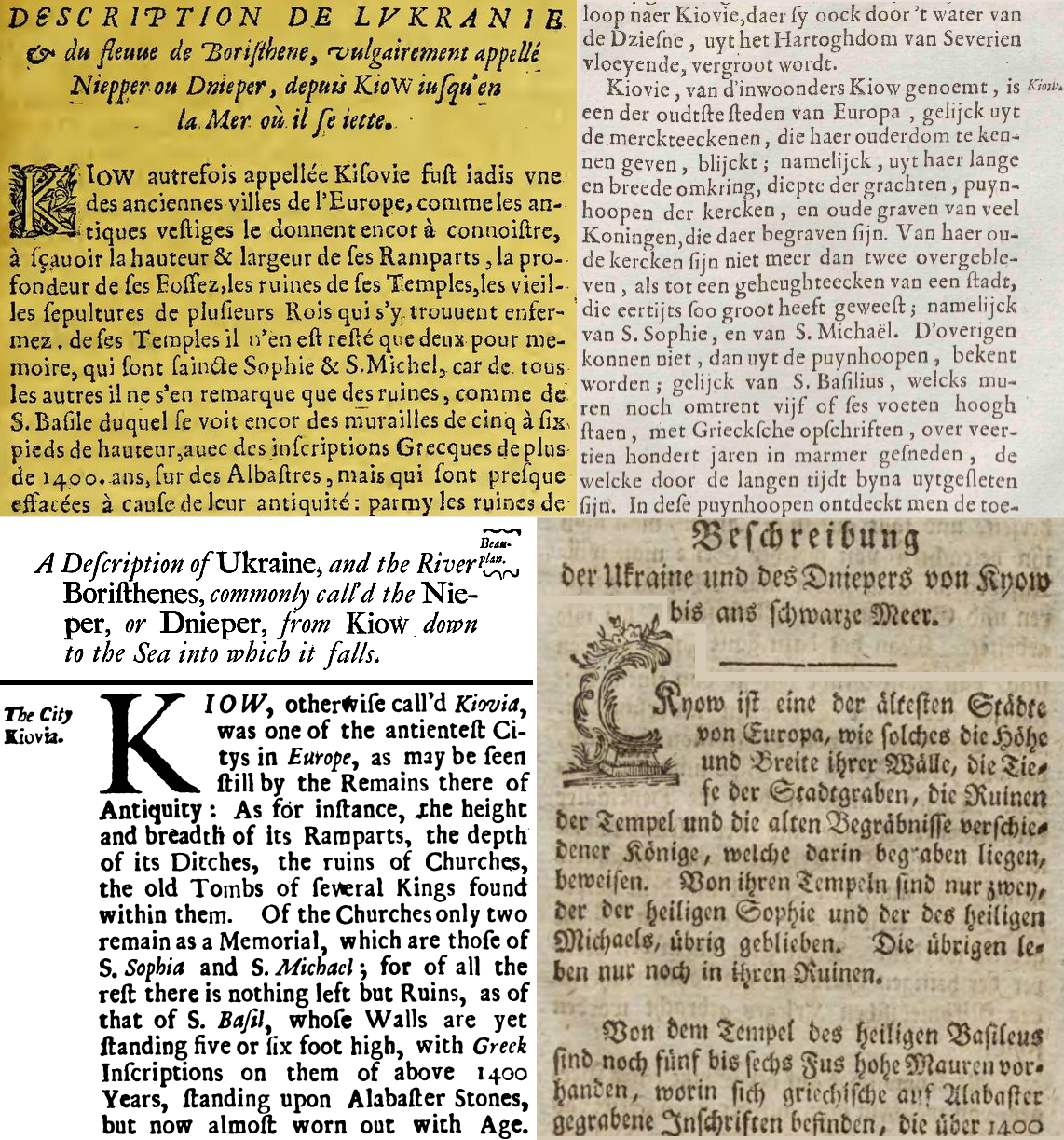
Introduction about Kyiv (Kiow) in four editions: French (Rouen 1660), Dutch (Amsterdam 1664), English (London 1704), and German (Wrocław 1780). "KIOW, otherwise call'd Kiovia, was one of the antientest Citys in Europe, as may be seen still by the Remains there of Antiquity..."

The 1660 edition of the book consists of the following parts: (Note: Beauplan. Description of Ukraine. Comments (1–199). Beauplan. Description of Ukraine. Comments (200–423).)

- Address
- To the readers
- To the reader from the publisher
- A description of Ukraine and the river Boristhenus, popularly called Nipro, or Dnipro, from Kyiv to the sea into which it flows
- Crafts practised by the Cossacks
- Ruthenian nobility
- What are the duties of the peasants towards the lords
- About Crimea, or the land of Tatarstan
- The Crimean Tatars
- About the Cossacks
- How girls court boys
- How a peasant can marry a young lady
- How the wedding takes place
- Cossack medicine
- [About the fauna of Ukraine]
- [About the climate of Ukraine]
- [About Poland]. How a king is elected
- About noble liberties
- Customs of the Polish nobility

Serhii Plokhy (2006) noted: "Although the title of the 1660 edition described Ukraine as a group of Polish provinces extending from Transylvania to the Muscovite border, the narrative focused on the Dnipro region, from Kyiv in the north to Zaporizhia and the territory controlled by the Crimean Tatars in the south. Thus, most of the reprints and translations of Beauplan's book appeared under titles that highlighted the Dnipro River, the Zaporozhian Cossacks, and the Crimean Tatars – the main markers of Beauplan's "Ukraine"."

== Quotes from the work ==
=== Wedding practices ===
[page 65] "The wedding ceremonies are as follows: the young people from both sides are invited, and then they are ordered by the bride and groom to invite all their mutual relatives to attend the wedding [Wesellé (Note: Modern Ukrainian: весілля vesillja.)], i.e. their wedding party. Each person who fulfils this order is given a wreath of flowers to hang on his or her arm and a list of all the invitees, to whom they go in pairs on the eve of the wedding. The first person to speak, solemnly pronouncing the invitation, holds a wand in his hand. I will not dwell on the description of the dishes and the number of varieties of meat served on the table, but I will only say that the bride is dressed according to their custom as follows: she wears a long brown cloth dress that stretches along the ground, bordered on top with half-silk, half-woolen braid and hemmed in with a whale's whisker that widens it. The [bride's] head is uncovered, her hair is scattered over her shoulders, revealing only her face, and she wears a wreath of flowers depending on the season. Wearing such a dress, her father, brother or close relative [page 66] leads her to the church, with a violin, duda or cymbals in front of her. After the wedding, one of her close relatives takes her by the hand and takes her home to the same melody. I will not describe the amusements during the wedding feast; they, though unusual, are in no way inferior to those of other nations. I will only note that they are especially encouraged to be naturally reckless by the fact that on the occasion of weddings and christenings of their children the local lord allows them to brew beer. Thanks to this privilege, they can drink it much cheaper and in larger quantities, for it should be noted that at other times the breweries belong to the lords, and all subjects must buy beer there..."

=== On the Cossacks ===
Description d'Ukranie, pages 54–55, on the Cossacks.

[page 54] "We still have to tell you, as we promised earlier, how the Cossacks elect their elders and how they cross the Black Sea and march all the way to Anatolia [Natolie] to fight the Turk. This is how they choose their chief: when all the old colonels and old Cossacks who are respected among them gather, each of them casts his vote for the one he considers the most capable, and the one chosen is determined by a majority vote. If the elected one does not want to accept the position, claiming inability, little merit, lack of experience or old age, this does not help him. The only answer is that he really did not deserve such an honour, and then, without hesitation, they immediately kill him as a traitor. Although they themselves are acting in a traitorous manner, as you probably recall from what I said earlier about their customs and habitual betrayals. If the elected Cossack assumes the duties of the elder, he thanks the assembly for the honour, although [he adds that] he is unworthy and unfit for such a position, and then solemnly assures them that he will make every effort to serve everyone in general and each one in particular with dignity, and that he is always ready to lay down his life for his brothers (as they call each other). At his words, everyone claps their hands,

[page 55] exclaiming: "Glory! Glory!" [Vivat, Vivat; Слава! Слава!] etc. Then, one by one, according to their rank, they go to bow to him, and the elder gives them his hand, which is a form of greeting. This is how they choose their elder, which often happens in the Wild Fields. They obey him very much. This elder is called a hetman [hettman] in their language. His power is unrestricted, up to and including the right to behead and put the guilty on the stake. Hetmans are very strict, but they do not start anything without a military meeting called the Rada [Ruds]. The disgrace to which the chief may be subjected makes him very careful in his actions, in particular that no failure should occur when he leads them on a campaign, and that he should prove himself cunning and brave during unforeseen encounters [with the enemy], since for cowardice he is killed as a traitor. A new ataman is immediately elected in the same way as I described above. It is not an easy task to lead them and command them on a campaign, and unhappy is the one who has to do it. In the seventeen years that I have served in this region, all those who have held this government have ended badly..."

== Analysis and significance of the Description of Ukraine ==
Awareness of the fact that the work of Guillaume Levasseur de Beauplan was the beginning of a new era in the study of Ukraine was gradually spreading in science through the use of his Description and maps in solving specific scientific problems. However, Beauplan's works were often used in a consumerist way, rarely covering his legacy as a whole. It was common to extract from Beauplan some data needed to explain certain phenomena, events, and circumstances. Such issues as the history of the Cossacks, military history, ethnography Ukrainians and Crimean Tatars, historical geography, topography and cartography with onomastics, iconography and geodesy excursions.

- Izmail Sreznevsky (1812–1880), the future great Slavist, analysed and commented in detail on several specific accounts of Beauplan: about the ‘Zaporozhian country’, the diet of the Cossacks, the Cossack council, the island of Skarbnitsa Voychna, Kodak, and others. Inspired by romantic tendencies, only a few of Sreznevsky's statements stand up to historical criticism.
- Apollon Skalkowski (1808–1898) remained faithful to Beauplan throughout his decades of scholarship. Starting with his Essays on Zaporizhzhia, in which Skalkowski used the Description to explain topo- and ethnonymy (that the Cossacks called Russia and Russians Muscovy and Moskals), through his History of the New Sich, in which he substantiated geographical and other realities on the authority of the Description and maps, to numerous historical essays scattered throughout various editions.
- Peter von Köppen (1798–1864), a well-known statistician, ethnographer, and bibliographer, made full use of the data from Beauplan's Description of Crimean cities. Köppen may be credited with the rather consistent introduction of Beauplan as a historical and geographical source in the so-called Semenov's Dictionary of the Russian Empire.
- Mykola Markevych (1804–1860) put Beauplan in the first place in the list of sources for his History of Little Russia. Markevych relied on the Description and the General Map of Ukraine to define the borders of Ukraine, prove the antiquity of the city of Cherkasy, and cover the issue of peasant duties, the colonisation activities of Polish Hetman Koniecpolski, and the construction of the Kodak fortress. J.-B. Scherer, author of Analysis of Little Russia (Paris, 1788), he characterised as a plagiarist of Beauplan.
- Mykola Kostomarov (1817–1885) believed that it belongs to the category of sources that 'although very important, require a particularly strict and cautious criticism.'

== Bibliography ==
=== Primary sources ===
- Beauplan, Guillaume Le Vasseur de (1660). DESCRIPTION D'VKRANIE, QVI SONT PLVSIEVRS Prouinces du Royaume de Pologne, CONTENVËS DEPVIS les confins de la Moscouie, iusques aux limites de la Transilvanie. ENSEMBLE LEVRS MOEVRS, façons de viuns, & de faire la Guerre [Description of Ukraine, which are several Provinces of the Kingdom of Poland, Contained from the borders of Muscovy, up to the limits of Transylvania. Together, their customs, ways of living, and waging War] (in French). Rouen: Jacques Cailloüé. p. 112. – digital transcription of the 1660 edition in the original French, published along with the 1990 modern Ukrainian translation in Kyiv.
- Beauplan, Guillaume Le Vasseur de (1990). Опис України, Кількох Провінцій Королівства Польського, Що Тягнуться Від Кордонів Московії До Границь Трансільванії, Разом З Їхніми Звичаями, Способом Життя І Ведення Воєн [Description of Ukraine, several provinces of the Kingdom of Poland, extended from the border of Muscovy to the border of Transylvania, together with their customs, way of life, and warfare] (in Ukrainian). Translated by Kravets, Ya. I.; Borysyuk, Z. P. Kyiv: Izbornyk. p. 113. – modern Ukrainian translation.
- Krawciw, Bohdan (1959). "Guillaume le Vasseur Sieur de Beauplan's "Description of Ukraine" and his military maps of Ukraine — By Bohdan Krawciw" (PDF). A Description of Ukraine, by Guillaume le Vasseur Sieur de Beauplan. New York: Organization for Defense of Four Freedoms for Ukraine. pp. IX–XII.
- Vavrychyn M., Holjko O., Dashkevych Ya., « Боплан і Україна» збірник наукових праць. ["Beauplan and Ukraine". Collection of scientific papers]. Lviv: 1998, pp. 16, 22, 34, 47, 49, 51, 61, 65, 295.
- "Гійом Левассер де Боплан та його "Опис України"" [Guillaume Levasseur de Beauplan and his "Description of Ukraine"]. «Україна. Історія Великого народу» ('Ukraine. A History of a Great People') (in Ukrainian). Archived from the original on 31 December 2014.
- "Боплан Гійом Левассер, де (1600-)" [Beauplan Guillaume Levasseur, de (1600–)]. Universal Scientific Library of Dnipropetrovsk Oblast (in Ukrainian). Archived from the original on 22 December 2014.

=== Literature ===
- Bagrow, Leo (1953). "The First Maps of the Dnieper Cataracts". Imago Mundi. 10. Taylor & Francis: 87–97. ISSN 0308-5694. JSTOR 1150146.
- Essar, D. F.; Pernal, A. B. (1982). "Beauplan's "Description d'Ukranie": A Bibliography of Editions and Translations". Harvard Ukrainian Studies. 6 (4). Harvard Ukrainian Research Institute: 485–499. ISSN 0363-5570. JSTOR 41036007.
- Essar, Dennis F.; Pernal, Andrew B. (1990). "The First Edition (1651) of Beauplan's Description d'Ukranie". Harvard Ukrainian Studies. 14 (1/2). Harvard Ukrainian Research Institute: 84–96. ISSN 0363-5570. JSTOR 41036356.
- Pernal, A. B.; Essar, D. F. (1985). "The 1652 Beauplan Maps of the Ukraine". Harvard Ukrainian Studies. 9 (1/2). Harvard Ukrainian Research Institute: 61–84. ISSN 0363-5570. JSTOR 41036133.
- Plokhy, Serhii (2006). The Origins of the Slavic Nations: Premodern Identities in Russia, Ukraine, and Belarus (PDF). New York: Cambridge University Press. pp. 10–15. ISBN 978-0-521-86403-9. Archived (PDF) from the original on 6 June 2011.
- Sossa, Rostyslav (2022). "Polityczne i administracyjne granice ziem ukraińskich w pracach Guillaume'a Beauplana". Z Dziejów Kartografii. 24: 341–356.
- Wójcik, Zbigniew (1972). Eryka Lassoty i Wilhelma Beauplana opisy Ukrainy [Descriptions of Ukraine by Erich Lassota and Guillaume de Beauplan.] (in Polish).
