= Pitlurg Castle =

Coordinates: 57.496°N 2.9428°W

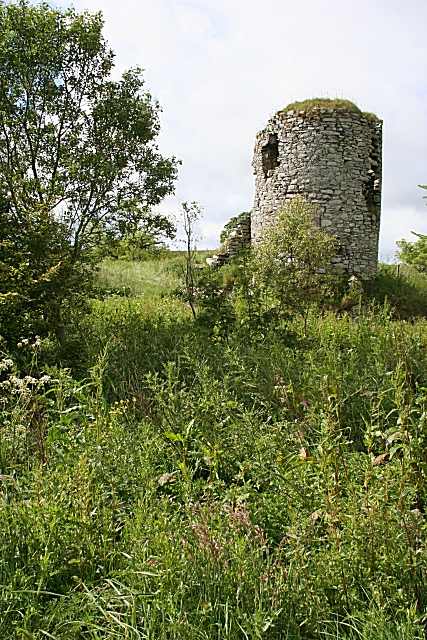
Pitlurg Castle

Pitlurg Castle was a 16th-century keep, about 3.5 miles (5.6 km) south of Keith, Banffshire, Scotland, north of the Burn of Davidston, at Mains of Pitlurg.

== History ==
The name 'Pitlurg', meaning 'the hillside place', suggests there was an earlier Pictish settlement on the site.

A Gordon family, descended from Jock o’Scurdargue, owned the lands until 1724. It was partly occupied until the 1760s. General Gordon, 1815, a descendant, took the name for his estate of Leask and Birness, Formartine.

=== Gordons of Pitlurg ===
When James VI was at Aberdeen, on 4 August 1589 he wrote to John Gordon of Pitlurg (1547–1600) asking him for a hackney horse for his use and the use of his bride-to-be, Anne of Denmark. The Earl of Huntly and other Gordon lairds sent him to Edinburgh to speak for them in 1593. In 1594 James VI invited him to the baptism of Prince Henry to be a companion to the ambassadors. In October 1594 James VI made John Gordon of Pitlurg keeper of Huntly Castle.

Robert Gordon of Straloch was born at Kinmundy near Newmachar and resided at Pitlurg, inheriting the estate from his brother John.

== Structure ==
Pitlurg Castle was a Z-plan tower house and courtyard. Only one round tower with two vaulted storeys remains. It is now a doocot.

The castle was built on rock. To the south was the Den of Pitlurg, while there was an open view to the west. There was a well in the castle courtyard, while it is thought that the castle was surrounded by a deep ditch, and there was a long range of buildings to the west. The structure to the east has been removed, but it is marked by a rebuilt doorway, and by the remains of a stone staircase leading to the second floor of the tower on the south-east side.

== See also ==
- Castles in Great Britain and Ireland
- List of castles in Scotland
- Pitlurg (Village)
