= David Paulin =

Scottish banker and actuary

Sir David Paulin FFA FRSE (1847–1930) was a Scottish banker and actuary and the first person within the insurance industry to be knighted. Together with James Sorley he founded the Scottish Life Assurance Company in 1881. He managed the company from 1881 to 1918 under the chairmanship of Sir Arthur Mitchell.

== Life ==
He was born in Irvine on 27 October 1847. He was the son of George Paulin, Rector of Irvine Academy, and his wife, Annie Macdougall. He attended Irvine Academy.

He was among Scotland's most accomplished businessmen during his time, holding prestigious roles such as President of the Actuarial Society and the Insurance Society of Edinburgh. Additionally, he served as Chairman of the Associated Scottish Life Offices and was President of the Scottish Society of Economists. His influence extended to serving as a Trustee of the Scottish Widows Fund, a Director of the Arizona Copper Company, and Vice-President of the Edinburgh Chamber of Commerce. Moreover, he held the position of Chairman at the Edinburgh Canadian Mortgage Company. He was a devoted Christian within the United Free Church of Scotland and Treasurer of the National Council of the YMCA. He served on a voluntary basis as Chairman of the Scottish Advisory Committee for the Welfare of the Blind.

In the late 19th century he lived at 44 Moray Place, a huge Georgian townhouse on the Moray Estate on the western edge of Edinburgh's New Town. He also owned a huge country estate at Macrihanish.

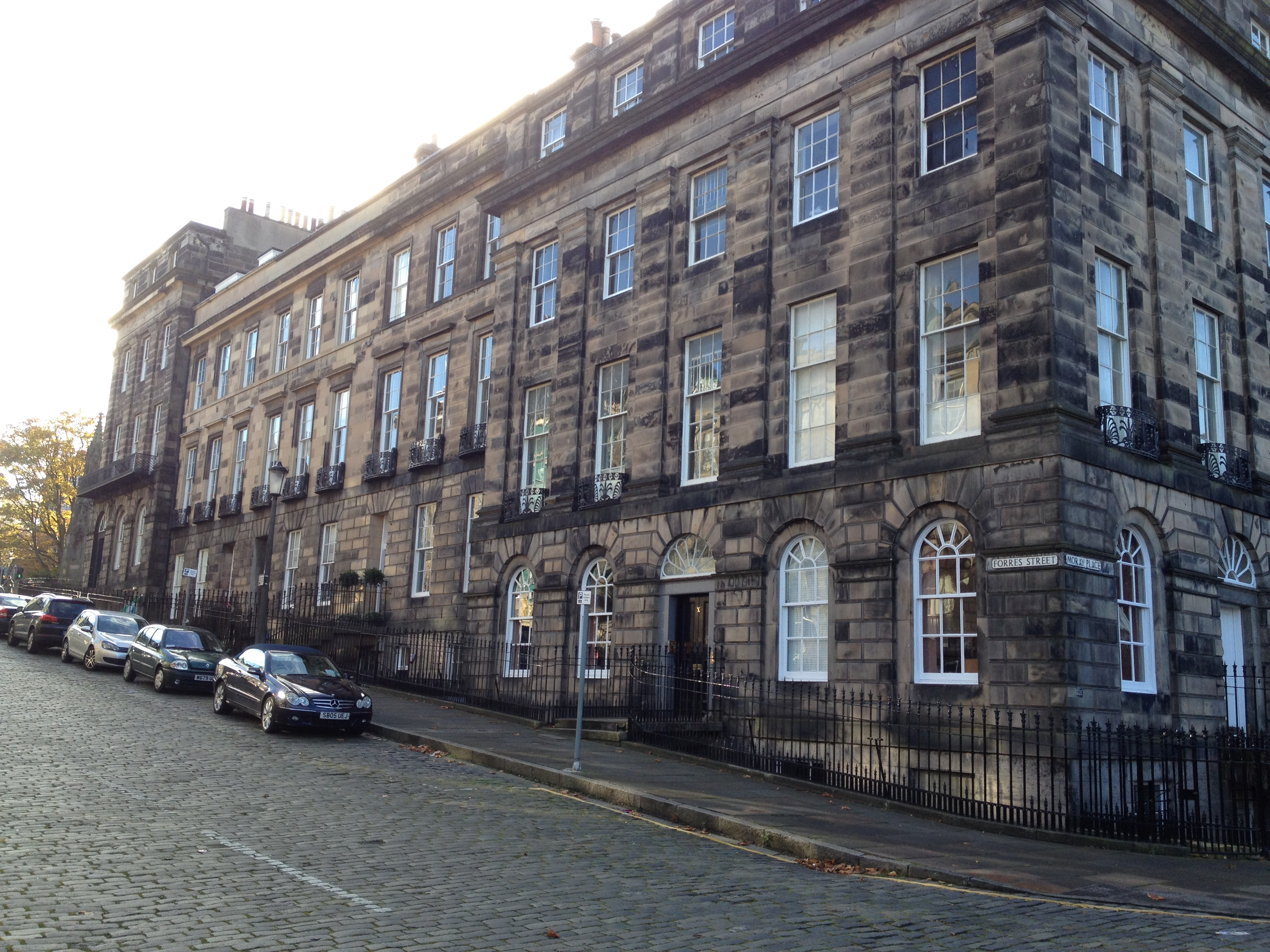
2 to 10 Forres Street, Edinburgh

In 1892 he was elected a Fellow of the Royal Society of Edinburgh. His proposers were Sir Arthur Mitchell, Thomas Bond Sprague, John McLaren, Lord McLaren, and Alexander Buchan. He was knighted in 1909 by Edward VII, the first person knighted for services to the insurance industry.

His final years were spent at 6 Forres Street, still on the prestigious Moray Estate in Edinburgh's West End.

In 1923 he was made an honorary life member of the Irvine Burns Club.

He died on 20 December 1930.

== Family ==
In 1874 he married Jessie Elizabeth McNeill, thereafter Lady Jessie Elizabeth Paulin. Their daughter, Annie Florence, died from cancer on 16 February 1916, aged 26. He had 2 sons. Neil and Freddy.

David Paulin was uncle to the sculptor George Henry Paulin.
