= George Arthur Mitchell =

Scottish mining engineer and company director

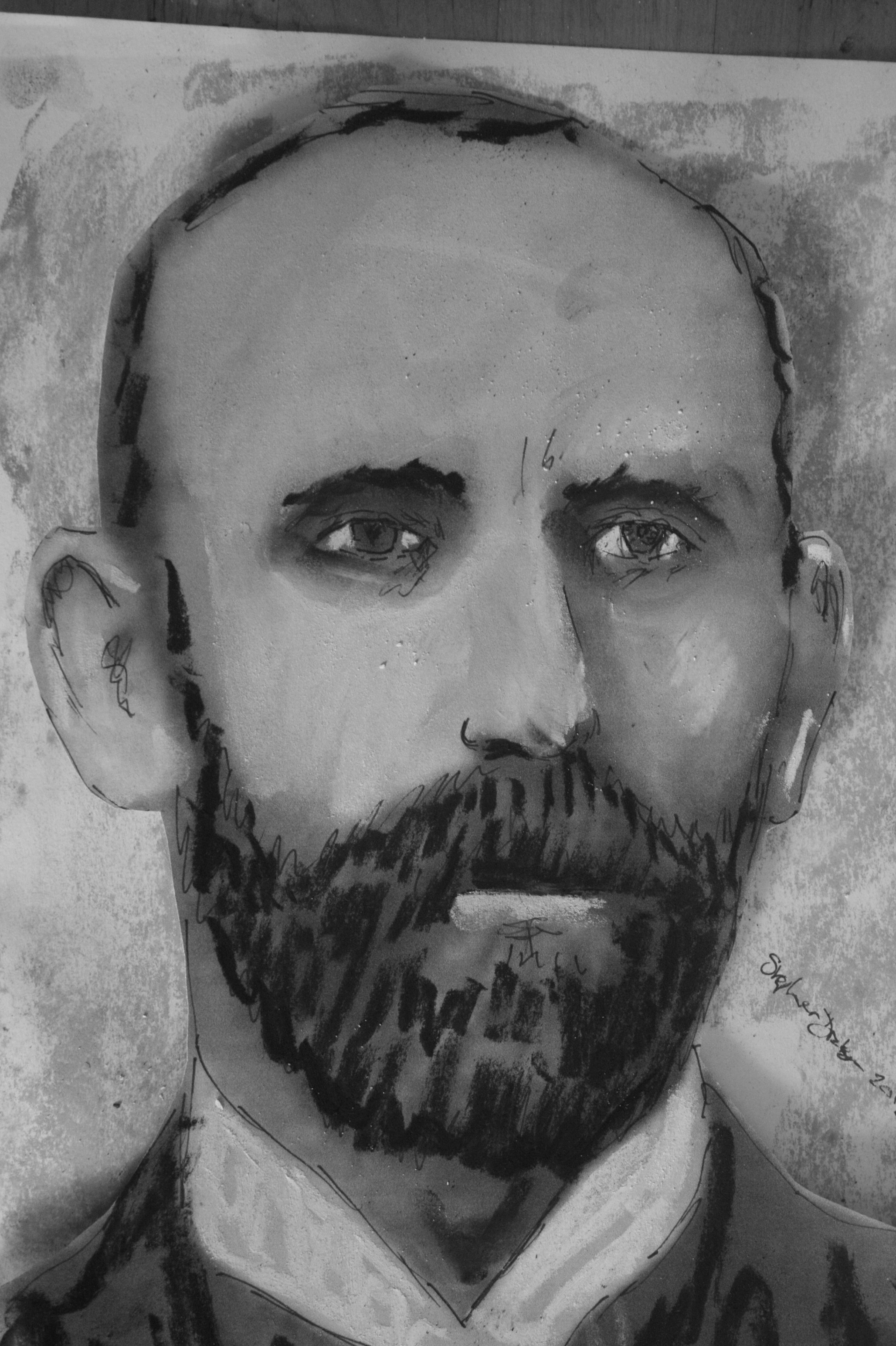
Sir George Arthur Mitchell, pastel drawing by Stephen C Dickson

Sir George Arthur Mitchell FRSE MIME (1860–1948) was a Scottish mining engineer and company director. He was Director of both the Clydesdale Bank and Midland Bank and of several collieries. He endowed the Mitchell Lectures at Glasgow University.

== Life ==
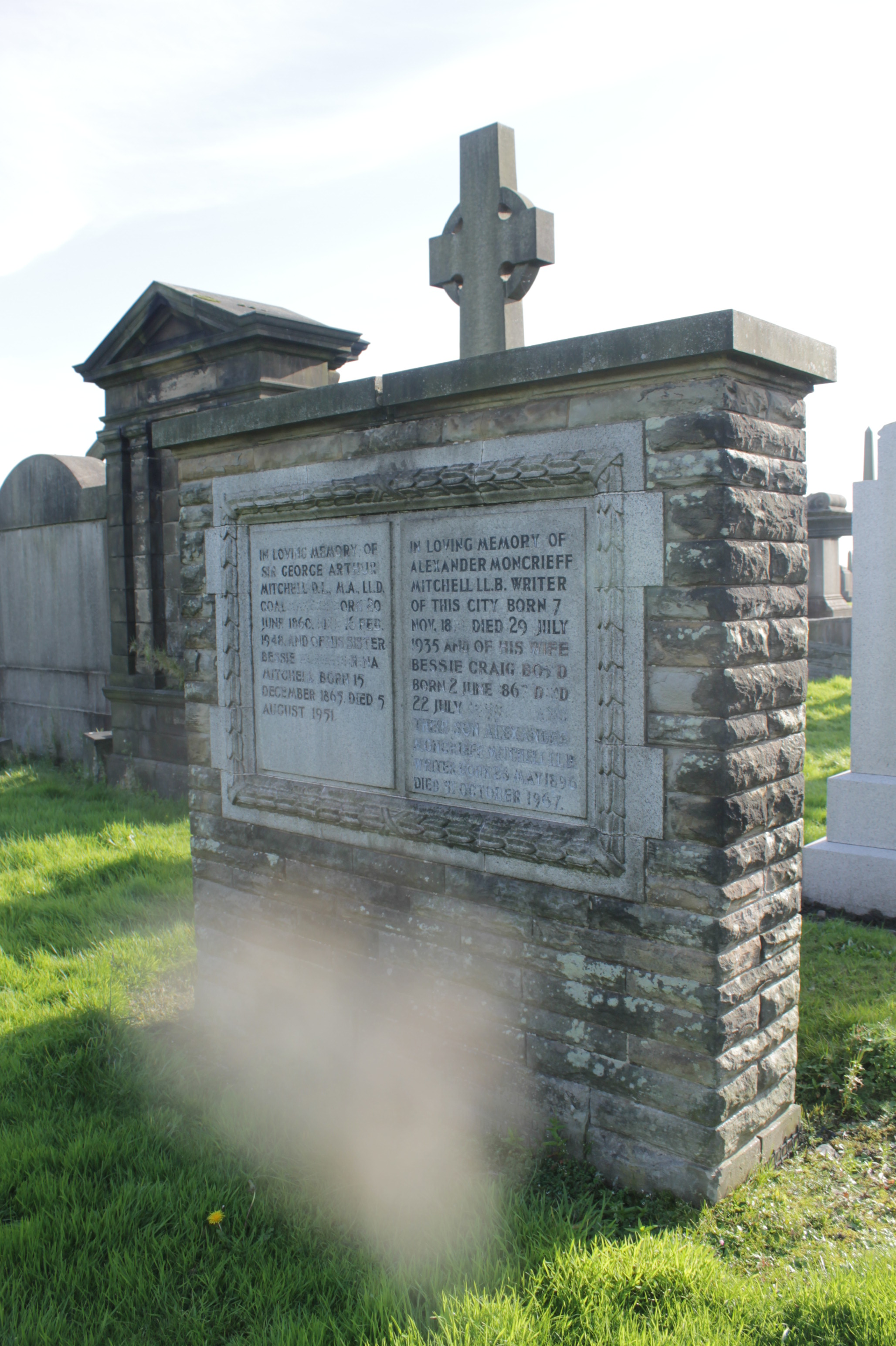
The grave of George Arthur Mitchell, Glasgow Necropolis

He was born in Hamilton, Lanarkshire, on 20 June 1860, the son of Alexander Moncrieff Mitchell, a colliery owner (son of Moncrieff Mitchell), and his wife Elizabeth Mitchell, sister of Sir Arthur Mitchell. He studied Science and engineering at Glasgow University graduating MA.

In 1897 he was elected a Fellow of the Royal Society of Edinburgh. His proposers were Lord Kelvin, John Gray McKendrick, James Thomson Bottomley and Sir Arthur Mitchell. He was knighted by King George V in 1935.

In 1904 he was living in a new and exclusive property at 9 Lowther Terrace in Kelvinside in Glasgow and was listed as Director of the Flemington Coal Company. The building was designed by his architect cousin Sydney Mitchell in 1906.

He died at Drumquhassle House near Drymen on 16 February 1948. He is buried in the Glasgow Necropolis. The grave lies on the eastern edge of the north section on the upper plateau.

He did not marry and had no children. He was Deacon of the Hammermen of Glasgow in 1922.

== Positions of Note ==
- President of the Mining Institute of Scotland 1894 to 1898
- President of the Institute of Mining Engineers 1895/6
- President of the Mining Association of Great Britain 1906/7
- Vice President of the Institute of Engineers and Shipbuilders of Scotland 1919 to 1922
- President of the Glasgow Chamber of Commerce 1923 to 1925
- Director of the Clydesdale Bank
- Director of the Midland Bank
- Director of Stewarts & Lloyds Ltd
- Director of the Lochgelly Iron and Coal Company
- Director of Robert Addle & Sons Collieries Ltd
- Director of Plean Colliery Ltd
- Director of the Flemington Coal Co Ltd
