= Straloch House =

House in Aberdeenshire, Scotland

- parish of Newmachar, Scotland

Location
- Coordinates: 57.2799°N 2.2328°W

Designations

Inventory of Gardens and Designed Landscapes in Scotland
- Official name: Straloch
- Designated: 31 March 2006
- Reference no.: GDL00351

Straloch House is a mansion house in the parish of Newmachar, Aberdeenshire, Scotland. The mansion house stands on the site of the former castle of Straloch.

The house is a Category A listed building and the grounds are on the Inventory of Gardens and Designed Landscapes.

== Straloch Castle ==
The Cheynes of Straloch came into the procession of the lands of Straloch in the 13th century through the marriage of Reginald le Chen (d.1312) and the heiress Mary, daughter of Freskin de Moravia of Duffus and Strabok and Johanna de Strathnaver, and was given to Reginald's second son Francis le Chen. It remained in the Cheyne family for over 250 years.

In the 16th century it was sold to John Gordon of Pitlurg. Robert Gordon the cartographer came into the possession afterwards.

== Straloch House ==
The Gordon family sold the lands of Straloch in 1758 to John Ramsey, who demolished the tower house and built the existing mansion on the same site.
