= Pitlurg =

Pitlurg Leask
- Village In Scotland
- Leask
- Etymology: Ancient Scottish roots
- Motto: "God With Us"

Pitlurg is a small, historic settlement located in Aberdeenshire, Scotland. It sits roughly 5 miles northeast of the town of Ellon. The local geography is known for its "beautiful" rolling hills and natural woodlands.

== Geography ==
A major geographical highlight is the Den Of Pitlurg. This area is a narrow, ancient meltwater channel left behind by glaciers. It stretches for about 3 kilometers. The Den features a rich, wet environment filled with yellow marsh flowers and birch trees.

== History ==
Pitlurg is an old estate and historic site in Aberdeenshire, Scotland. The name means "the hillside place." This suggests people lived there long ago in Pictish times. For hundreds of years, it was home of a powerful branch of the Clan Gordon.

=== The Early Gordons ===
The lands of Pitlurg were given to a branch of the Gordon family in the year 1400. Early lairds were close to the Scottish Crown.

Jack Gordon was a trusted advisor to King James VI, this lasted from the year 1547 to 1600. The king visited him in Aberdeen and even made him keeper of Hunty Castle. Another early laird, Robert Gordon, became famous across Scotland as a great mapmaker and historian from 1580 to 1661.

By the year 1700, the original Pitlurg lands passed out of the family's direct control. A descendant later purchased a nearby property called Leask in 1731.

== See also ==
- Pitlurg Castle
- King James VI
- Pitlurg Railway Station
