= James Sorley =

Scottish actuary

James Sorley FFA FRSE (1853–1924) was a 19th/20th century Scottish actuary. In 2001 the company was absorbed into the Royal London Group.

== Life ==
He was born in Selkirk on 15 October 1853.

On the foundation of Scottish Life Assurance Company Sorley acted as Treasurer, with David Paulin as Manager, and all under the chairmanship of Sir Arthur Mitchell. Their prestigious office was at 19 St Andrew Square in Edinburgh's First New Town.

In 1882 he was elected a Fellow of the Royal Society of Edinburgh. His proposers were Thomas Sprague, Dr John Alexander Smith, William Thomson, Lord Kelvin, and James Sanderson.

In 1886 he was living at 26 George Street. He ran a chartered accountants firm: Paulin, Sorley & Martin from the same address.

He died in Cannes in the south of France on 5 February 1924. He is buried there.
