= Arthur Mitchell (physician) =

Scottish doctor

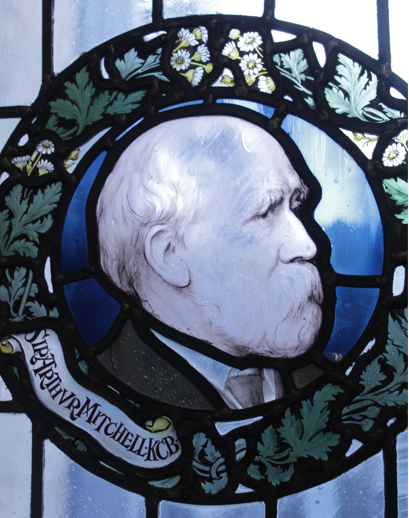
Stained glass of Sir Arthur Mitchell in Scottish National Portrait Gallery

Sir Arthur Mitchell MD KCB FRSE LLD (19 January 1826 – 12 October 1909) was a Scottish doctor involved in the study and care of patients with mental illness. He served on several public commissions, and wrote widely on history and anthropology.

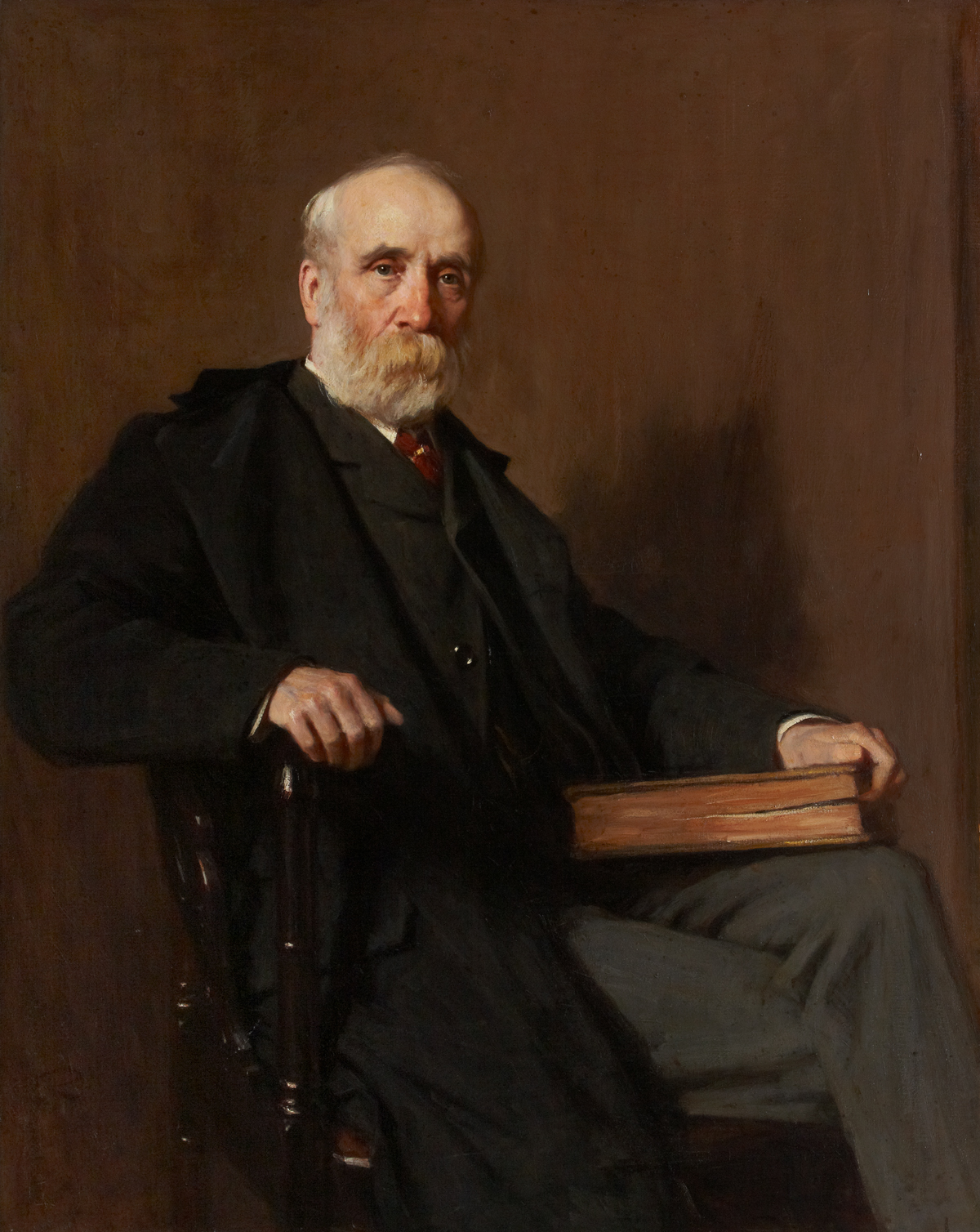
Sir Arthur Mitchell

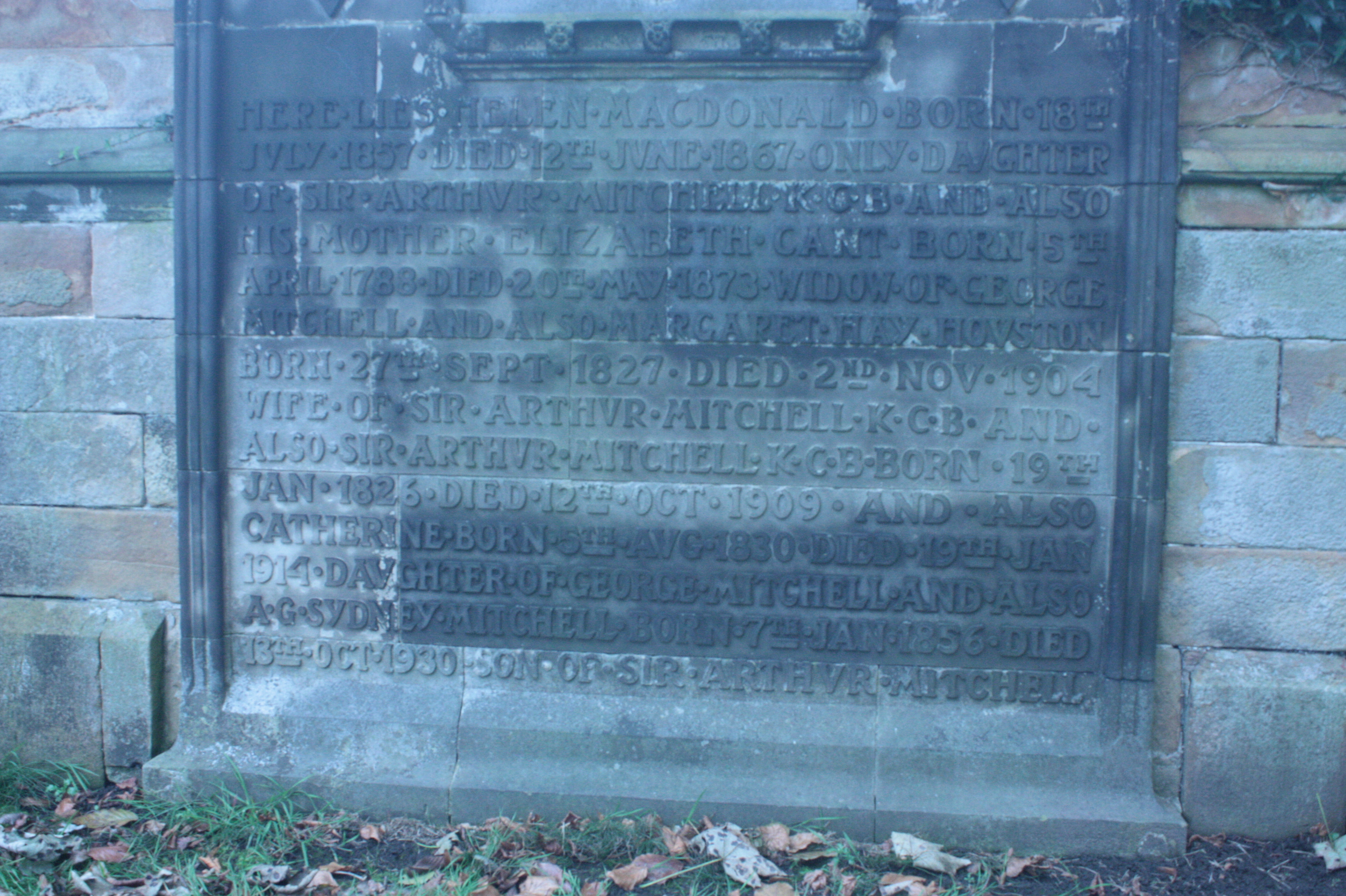
The Mitchell grave, Rosebank Cemetery, Edinburgh

== Life ==
Mitchell was born in Elgin, Moray, the son of George Mitchell, a civil engineer, and his wife, Elizabeth Cant. He was educated at Elgin Academy. He studied at the University of Aberdeen, graduating MA in 1845 and MD in 1850. He did further postgraduate studies in Paris, Berlin and Vienna.

=== Physician ===
From at least 1856 Mitchell was based at Larbert Hospital, Scotland's largest hospital specialising in mental health. He lived in Edinburgh, a short train journey away, at 7 Laverockbank Villas in the Trinity district.

In 1857 Mitchell was appointed Deputy Commissioner of Lunacy with the newly established General Board of Lunacy for Scotland, acting as deputy to William A.F. Browne. His appointment closely followed the publication of a report by the Scottish Lunacy Commission that prompted a greater understanding of the care of the insane. The appointment was controversial at the time, as he was still relatively inexperienced. His work included a study of individuals in private care, which was described in his publication The Insane in Private Dwellings. He reported that in 1862 there were 3628 insane persons in private care in Scotland, out of a total of 8207 (44%). While he recorded many cases of neglect and abuse in this setting, he argued that private care, if properly supervised, had an important part to play in the management of the insane. This suggestion was not in accord with the thrust of the 1857 report, which emphasised the role of district asylums. Susser (2010) gives a modern evaluation of this work, describing the methods used as going "well beyond the practices of his own time, and, in some respects, were better than the methods used in such investigations today.

The Insane in Private Dwellings included a great deal of statistical data, and this was to be a feature of much of his work. In 1865-1866 he published a series of papers examining the effects of consanguinous marriages on the offspring. This area was highly contentious, but much of the comment was based on anecdotal evidence or assertions without supporting evidence. While Mitchell's study was not conclusive, he identified the weaknesses of the existing work, and described in clear terms the two types of study that could resolve the issue: the first taking a large, representative, sample of defective births and comparing the parentage with that in the general population; the second, to collect family histories of everyone in a particular locality and follow up those with consaginuous marriages compared to unrelated marriages – in modern terms a cohort study. While he never carried out such studies, his evaluation of the evidence was the best that was available at the time, and his proposals for study design sound.

In 1870 Mitchell became Commissioner for Lunacy, a post he held until 1895. He continued with his research, and in 1877 published Contribution to the statistics of insanity which described a cohort study which followed all first asylum admissions in Scotland in the year 1858 for up to 12 years, to 1870. The total number of patients in the cohort was 1297. The study documented both those who remained within asylums, and those who left. In the latter case re-admissions, recoveries and deaths were recorded as far as possible. This was one of the first prospective studies carried out in psychiatry.

In 1866 he was elected a Fellow of the Royal Society of Edinburgh his proposer being John Hutton Balfour. He served as the Society's Vice President 1889 to 1894 and 1896 to 1902. and in 1880 he was appointed a member of the Commission on Criminal Lunacy in England. In 1885 he became a member of a committee on criminal lunatics in Ireland, and from 1889 chaired a commission to enquire into the lunacy administration of Ireland. In 1908 he was President of the Royal Meteorological Society.

=== Antiquarian ===
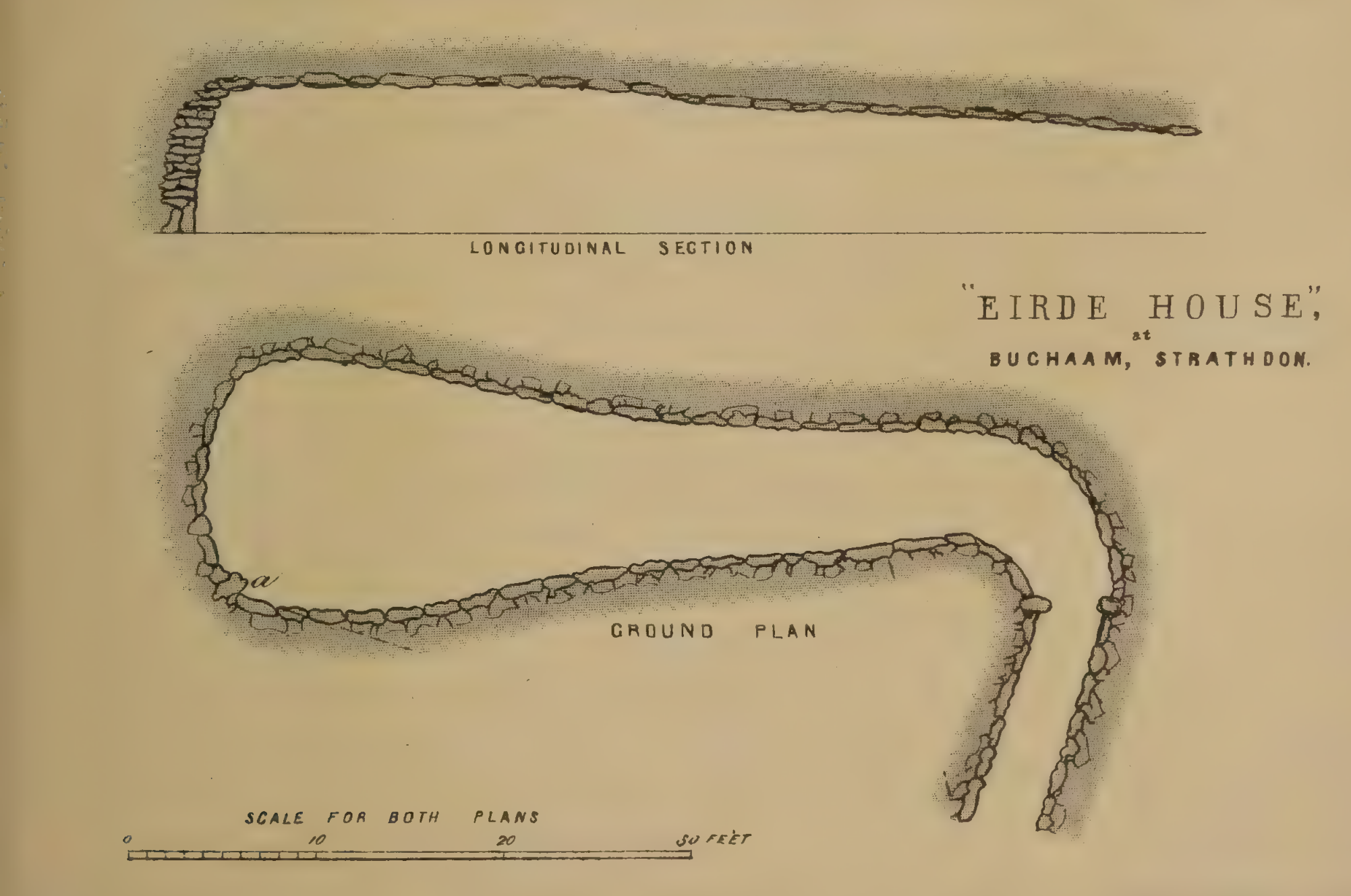
Eirde House (underground building) at Buchaam, Strathdon

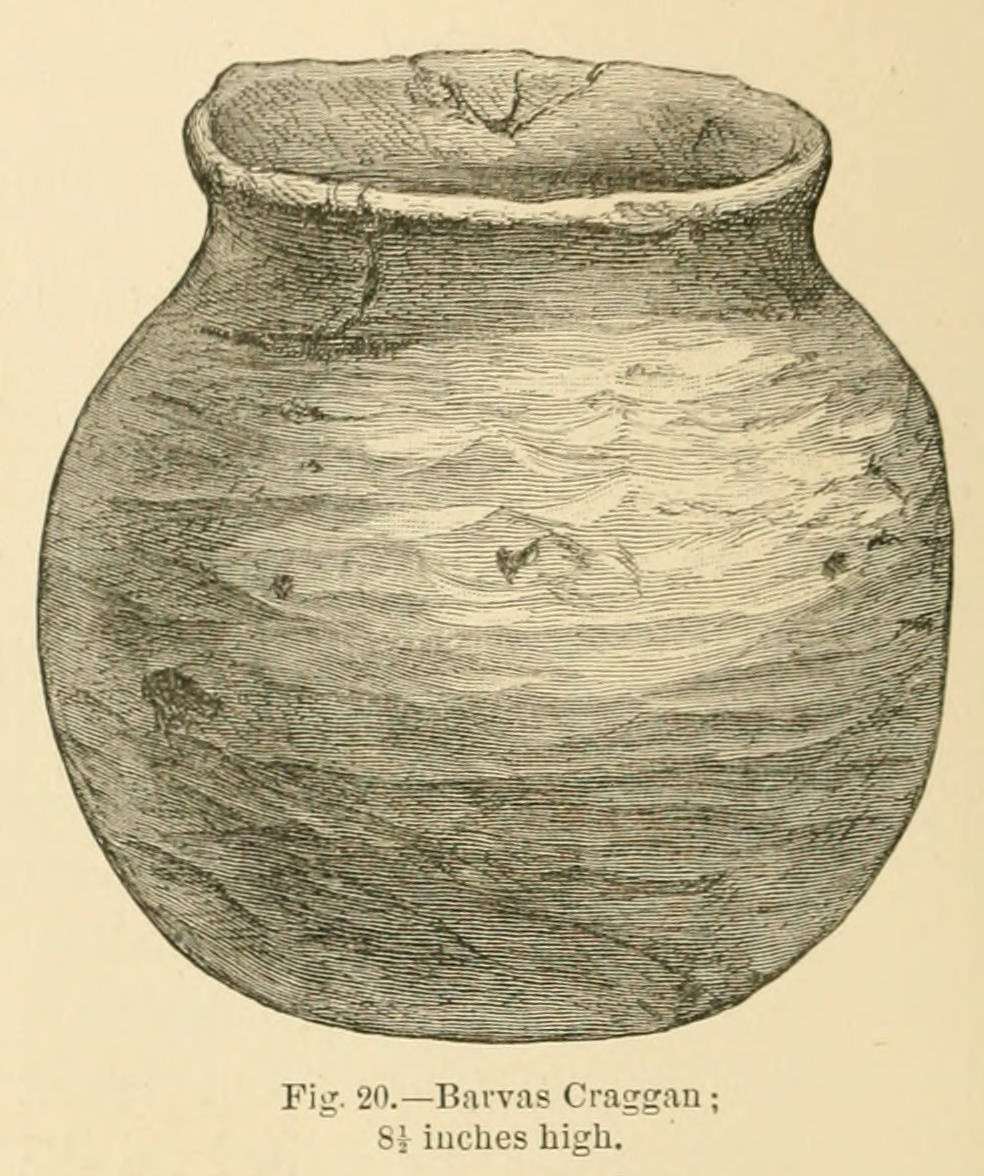
Craggan from Barvas, Isle of Lewis

Mitchell's work with the Board of Lunacy required him to travel extensively in Scotland, and he took advantage of this to carry out research in archaeology and anthropology. He reported on several underground buildings, and on a large collection of "rude stone implements" from Shetland. The stone implements were found in a variety of locations: on the surface; in subterranean structures; in the heart of a large tumulus; outside a stone coffin; or inside a kistvaen. Mitchell pointed out that the relatively crude workmanship could indicate an early origin, but could equally represent more recent work as an old skill declined. He used a similar argument in describing some of his finds in the communities of the Scottish islands, for example spindle whorls, and craggans, unglazed and usually undecorated clay pots. Mitchell not only saw these in use, but in several cases saw them being made. He commented that if they were found in an archeological excavation they might well be thought to be from the Stone Age. He also recorded the customs and practices of the places he visited, in particular regional superstitions. In 1876 he became the first Rhind lecturer, and described many of his findings in a series of six lectures, which were published as The Past in the Present: What is Civilisation?. His conclusion was that the difference in the essential characteristics of modern and early peoples are imperceptible, that civilisation was due to accumulated knowledge rather than an inherent superiority of its individual members.

Mitchell's paper On various superstitions in the north-west highlands and islands of Scotland, especially in relation to lunacy encompassed both of his interests in the management of the insane and folk-culture. As Donoho (2012) notes "It is the earliest text specifically devoted to Highland folk-cures for insanity, and it espoused Mitchell's strong views on the matter, which is that he did not find these folk cures remotely palatable or justifiable". Mitchell refers to "disgusting superstitions", for example the burial of a live cock as a cure for epilepsy. But while he regarded such customs as backward and ignorant, he sympathised with the distress of those who sought such cures. Discussing the adoration of wells, where supplicants would bathe a sick child in the waters, drop an offering in the well, and attach a bit of clothing to a nearby bush, he wrote: "Part of a bib or little pinafore tells the sad story of a sorrowing mother and a suffering child, and makes the heart grieve that nothing better than a visit to one of these wells had been found to relieve the sorrow and remove the suffering".

He held positions with the Society of Antiquaries of Scotland, the Scottish Meteorological Society, the Early Scottish Text Society, and council member of the Scottish History Society. He was a professor of ancient history to the Royal Scottish Academy. Other works included A List of Travels in Scotland 1296—1900.

In 1871 he was elected a member of the Harveian Society of Edinburgh. He received an honorary LLD from the University of Aberdeen in 1875. In 1886 Mitchell was made a Companion of the Bath (CB) by Queen Victoria, and was raised to the rank of Knight Commander of the Order of the Bath (KCB) the following year. He became an Honorary Fellow of the Royal College of Physicians of Ireland in 1891.

Unconnected to his medical life he was Chairman of the Scottish Life Assurance Company in Edinburgh. His managerial colleagues included David Paulin as Manager and James Sorley as Treasurer (who together had founded the company).

He retired in 1895 and died at home 34 Drummond Place in Edinburgh's New Town, on 12 October 1909. He was buried at Rosebank Cemetery, Edinburgh. The grave lies on the north-facing retaining wall in the centre of the cemetery.

== Family and Home ==
In 1855 he married Margaret Hay Houston (d.1904), daughter of James Houston of Tullochgriban in Strathspey.

For most of his adult life he lived in Edinburgh, first at 6 Laverockbank Villas in the Trinity district of Edinburgh, then at 34 Drummond Place in Edinburgh's New Town.

Their only child was Sydney Mitchell (1856–1930), a successful Edinburgh architect who was commissioned by Arthur to design Craig House as an asylum in 1887.

He was uncle to George Arthur Mitchell FRSE.

== Publications ==
- Mitchell, Arthur (1862). "On the Nithsdale Neck, or Goitre, in Scotland". The British and Foreign Medico-chirurgical Review. 29 (58): 512–515. PMC 5182320. PMID 30163663.
- —— (1863a). "Notice of the recent Excavation of an underground Building at Buchaam, Strathdon, on the property of Sir Charles Forbes, Bart., of Newe and Edinglassie". Proceedings of the Society of Antiquaries of Scotland. 4: 436–440. doi:10.9750/PSAS.004.436.443.
- —— (1863b). "On various superstitions in the north-west highlands and islands of Scotland, especially in relation to lunacy". Proceedings of the Society of Antiquaries of Scotland. 4: 251–288. doi:10.9750/PSAS.004.251.288.
- —— (1864). The insane in private dwellings. Edinburgh: Edmonston and Douglas.
- —— (1865a). "On the Influence Which Consanguinity in the Parentage Exercises upon the Offspring". Edinburgh Medical Journal. 10 (9): 781–794. PMC 5308973. PMID 29646552.
- —— (1865b). "On the Influence Which Consanguinity in the Parentage Exercises on the Offspring". Edinburgh Medical Journal. 10 (10): 894–913. PMC 5308937. PMID 29646521.
- —— (1865c). "On the Influence Which Consanguinity in the Parentage Exercises on the Offspring". Edinburgh Medical Journal. 10 (12): 1074–1085. PMC 5309006. PMID 29646581.
- —— (1866a). "Blood-relationship in marriage considered in its influence upon the offspring". Memoirs of the Anthropological Society of London. ii: 402–456.
- —— (1866b). "Some Statistics of Idiocy". Edinburgh Medical Journal. 11 (7): 639–645. PMC 5313798. PMID 29645552.
- —— (1868a). The care and treatment of the insane poor, with special reference to the insane in private dwellings. Edinburgh: Oliver and Boyd.
- —— (1868b). "Notice of an Eirde House at Eriboll, in the Parish of Durness, Sutherlandshire". Proceedings of the Society of Antiquaries of Scotland. 6: 249–250. doi:10.9750/PSAS.006.249.250. S2CID 253261294.
- —— (1870). "On some remarkable discoveries of rude stone implements in Shetland". Proceedings of the Society of Antiquaries of Scotland. 7: 118–134. doi:10.9750/PSAS.007.118.134. S2CID 253278319.
- —— (1877). "Contribution to the statistics of insanity". Journal of Mental Science. 22 (100): 507–515. doi:10.1192/bjp.22.100.507.
- —— (1879). Contribution to the study of the death-rate of persons in asylums. Lewes: Sussex Advertiser Office.
- —— (1881a). "Notice of Buildings designed for Defence on an Island in a Loch at Hogsetter, in Whalsay, Shetland". Proceedings of the Society of Antiquaries of Scotland. 15: 303–315. doi:10.9750/PSAS.015.303.315. S2CID 253275732.
- —— (1881b). The past in the present. What is civilization?. New York: Harper.
- —— (1901). "A List of Travels, Tours, Journeys, Voyages, Cruises, Excursions, Wanderings, Rambles, Visits, etc., relating to Scotland". Proceedings of the Society of Antiquaries of Scotland. 35 (431–638): 431–638. doi:10.9750/PSAS.035.431.638. S2CID 254519473.
- —— (1905). About dreaming, laughing and blushing. Edinburgh and London: W. Green and Sons.
- ——; Cash, Caleb George (1917). A contribution to the bibliography of Scottish topography. Edinburgh: The Scottish History Society. Volume 1; Volume 2.
- Combe, Andrew (1887). Mitchell, Arthur (ed.). Observations on Mental Derangement. Edinburgh: Maclachlan and Stewart.
- MacFarlane, Walter (1906–1908). Mitchell, Arthur (ed.). Geographical collections relating to Scotland made by Walter MacFarlane. Edinburgh: The Scottish History Society. Volume 1; Volume 2; Volume 3.
