= Robert Gordon of Straloch =

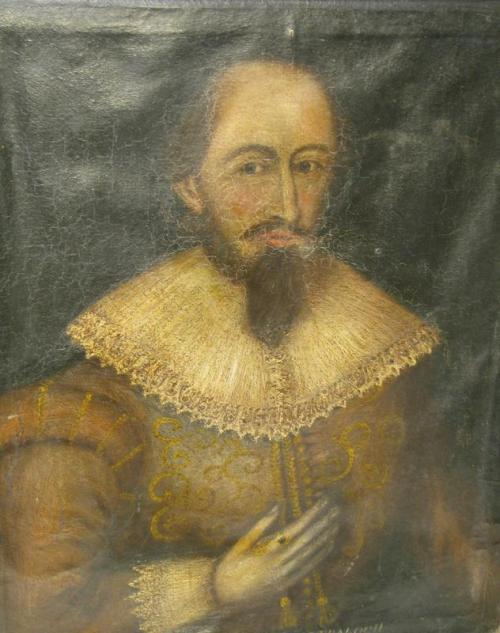
Painting, 1632 or later

Robert Gordon of Straloch (14 September 1580 – 18 August 1661) was a Scottish cartographer, noted as a poet, mathematician, antiquary, and geographer, and for his collection of music for the lute.

== Life ==
The younger son of Sir John Gordon of Pitlurg, Knight, (died 1600) by his spouse Isabel, daughter of William Forbes, 7th Lord Forbes, Robert Gordon was educated at the Marischal College, University of Aberdeen, of which he was the first graduate, and afterwards at the University of Paris. Sometime after 1608 he acquired the estate of Straloch, north of Aberdeen. After the death of his elder brother John Gordon without issue in 1619, Robert inherited his estate of Pitlurg.

The original manuscript of Robert's collection of lute music, known as the Straloch Manuscript, is lost, but transcriptions survive. His book, which included a tune for Greysteil was titled, 'Ane playing booke for the Lute, wherein are contained many currents and other musical things, Musica mentis medicina moestae, At Aberdeen, collected by Robert Gordon, February 1627.'

== Works ==
Map of Scotland by Robert Gordon, 1653

In 1641, Charles I wrote a letter, in which he entreated Gordon "to reveis the saidis cairtiss", to complete the publication of an atlas of Scotland, which had been projected by Timothy Pont. By two Acts of the Scottish Parliament he was exempted from any form of military service, while the General Assembly of the Church of Scotland published a request to the clergy, to afford him assistance. The undertaking was completed in 1648 and was published by Joan Blaeu of Amsterdam, under the title of Theatrum Scotiae. A second edition was published in 1655 and a third in 1662. This atlas was said to be the first delineation of Scotland made from actual survey and measurement.

Gordon made other maps, and revised many others, adding geographical descriptions, and prefixing an introduction in Blaeu, in which a comprehensive view is given of the constitution and antiquities of the country. These dissertations were one of the first attempts to settle the ancient history of Scotland.

He contributed other essays, many of which are still in manuscript form, some mentioned with much approbation by Bishop Nicolson in his Scottish Historical Library; the principal of which is a Latin manuscript History of the Family of Gordon from the earliest period to the year 1595, bearing the Latin title: Origo et Progressus Familiae illustrissimae Gordoniorum in Scotia.

He also wrote a preface to Archbishop Spottiswoode's History of the Church of Scotland, and translated into Latin the controversy between John Knox and Wolfram, sub-prior of St. Andrews. A critical letter of his on Scottish historians, which he addressed to the antiquarian David Buchanan, is inserted in Leyland's Collectanea; some of his poems have been printed in Bishop Forbes' Funerales (Aberdeen, 1635).

== Marriage and death ==
Robert Gordon married in 1608, Catherine, daughter of Alexander Irvine of Lenturk, by whom he had nine sons and six daughters.

He died in 1661, and was interred in the family burial place at New Machar on 6 September. A portrait of him, by Jameson, the Scottish van Dyck, hangs in the great hall of Marischal College. He was the grandfather of another Robert Gordon, the founder of Robert Gordon's Hospital which later became Robert Gordon's College and The Robert Gordon University.
