= Joan Blaeu =

Dutch cartographer (1596–1673)

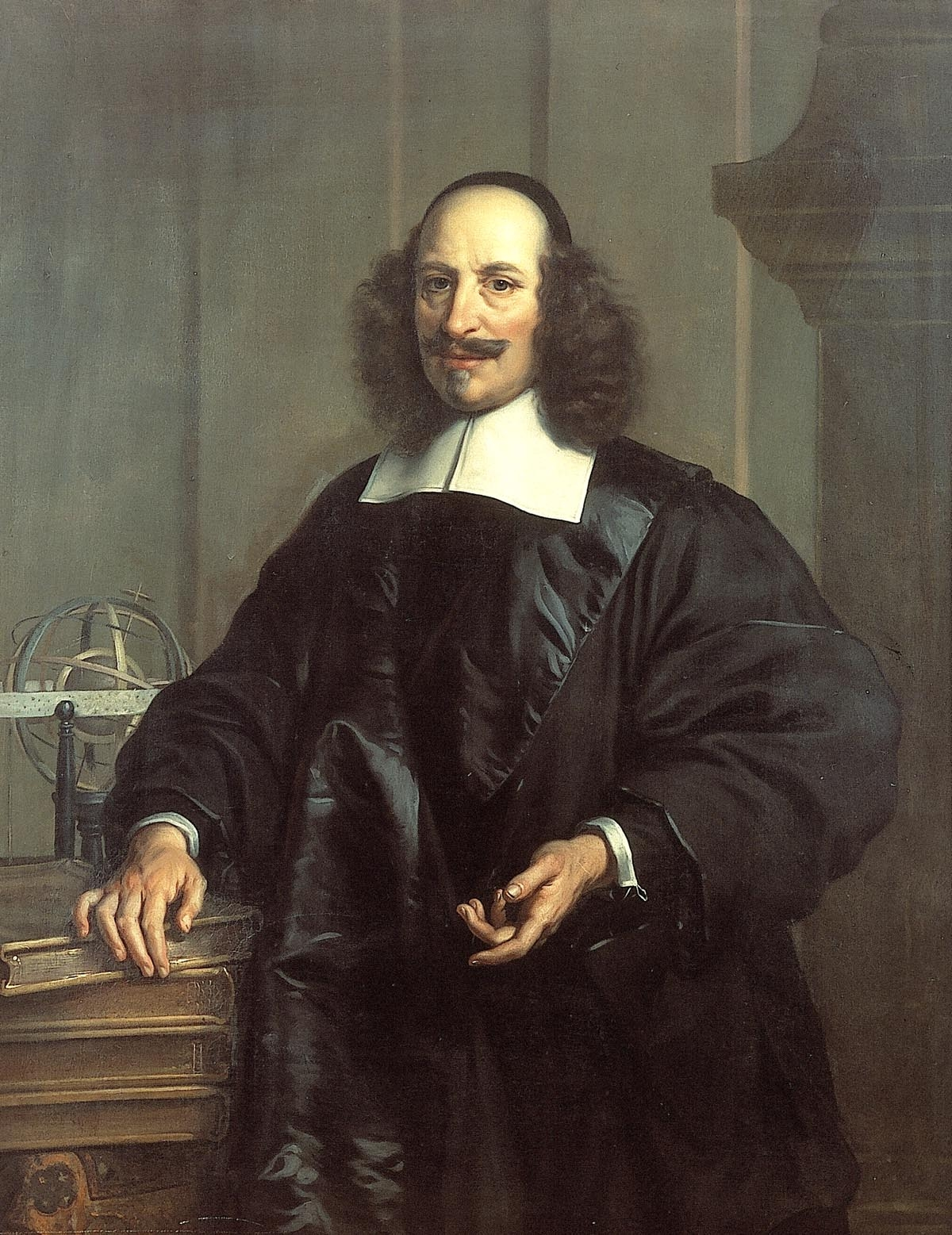
- Joan Blaeu by J. van Rossum
- Born: September 23, 1596; Alkmaar
- Died: 21 December 1673 (aged 77); Amsterdam
- Occupation: Cartographer
- Known for: First world map incorporating heliocentric theory Naming of New Zealand
- Spouse: Geertruid Vermeulen (1634-1673)
- Children: Joan II

Joan Blaeu (Dutch pronunciation: [ˈjoːɑm ˈblʌu]; 23 September 1596 – 21 December 1673), also called Johannes Blaeu, was a Dutch cartographer and the official cartographer of the Dutch East India Company. Blaeu is most notable for his map published in 1648, which was the first map to incorporate the heliocentric theory into a map of the world and was the first map that incorporated the discoveries of Abel Tasman. Blaeu renamed what is now New Zealand as Nieuw Zeeland after the Dutch province of Zeeland; the anglicized version of the name is still in use today.

== Early life ==
Joan Blaeu was born in 1596, the son of the cartographer Willem Blaeu and brother of Cornelis Blaeu. In 1620, Blaeu completed a doctor of law. In 1635, he and his father published the Atlas Novus (full title: Theatrum orbis terrarum, sive, Atlas novus) in two volumes. Blaeu succeeded his father as the official cartographer of the Dutch East India Company.

== Career ==
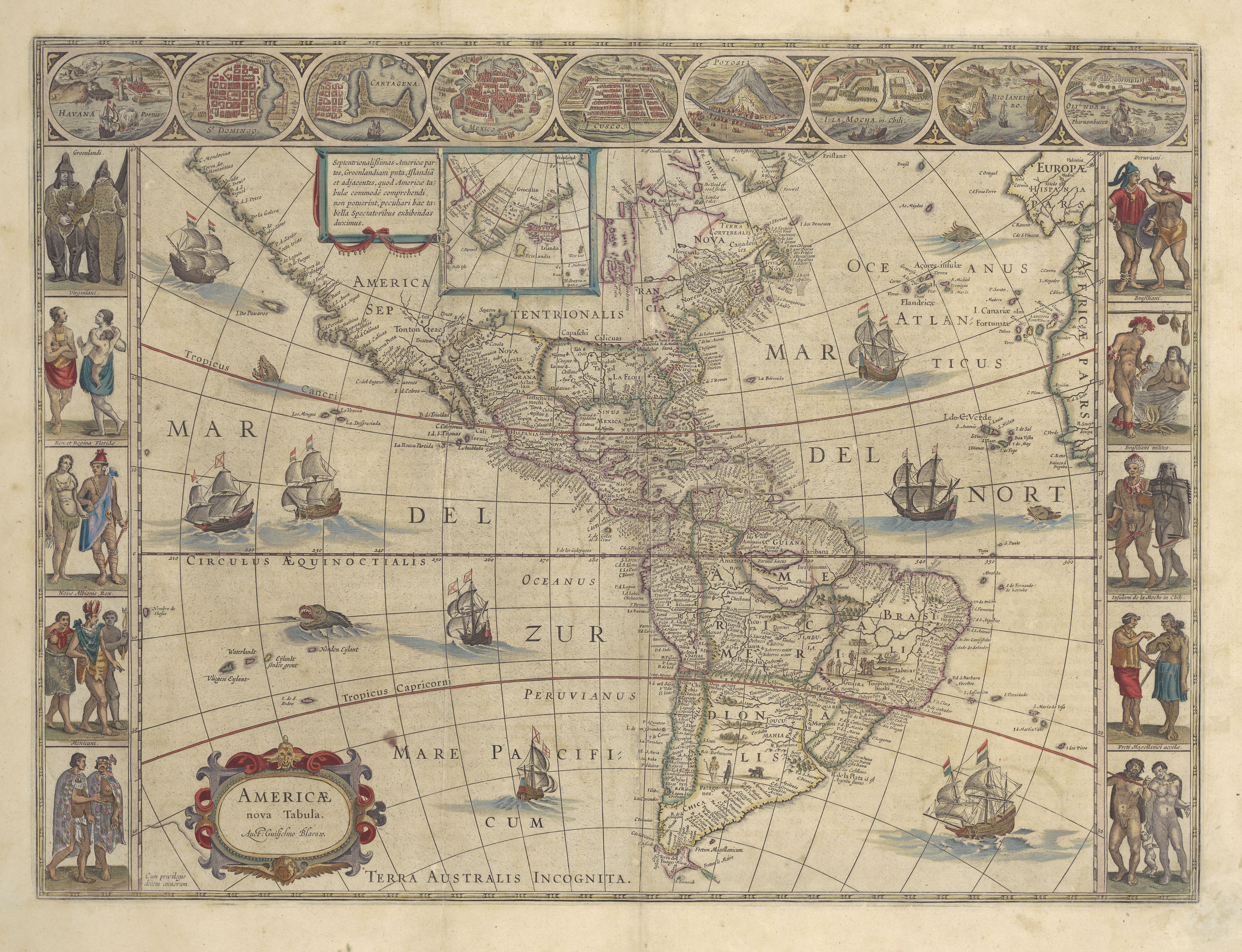
Americae Nova Tabula, 1614

Discussion of the acquisition and preservation of Archipelagus Orientalis by the National Library of Australia (2013)

After completing his legal studies, Blaeu did not enter the legal profession but instead joined his father's cartographic and publishing business. There, he became involved in the production of globes, maps, and atlases issued by the family firm. After their father's death in 1638, Blaeu and his brother took over the family business.

Blaeu's world map, Nova et Accuratissima Terrarum Orbis Tabula was published in 1648. This map was the first that depicted the Solar System according to the heliocentric theories of Nicolaus Copernicus, first printed in 1543, which show the earth revolving around the sun. This map was used as a template for the design of the pavement of the Groote Burger-Zaal of the new Amsterdam Town Hall, designed by the Dutch architect Jacob van Campen (now the Amsterdam Royal Palace), in 1655.

Blaeu's Hollandia Nova was also depicted in his Archipelagus Orientalis sive Asiaticus published in 1659 in the Kurfürsten Atlas (Atlas of the Great Elector), and was used by Melchisédech Thévenot to produce his map, Hollandia Nova—Terre Australe (1664).

He also published the 12-volume Le Grand Atlas, ou Cosmographie blaviane, en laquelle est exactement descritte la terre, la mer, et le ciel. One edition is dated 1663, in folio 540 mm × 340 mm (21 in × 13 in), which contained 593 engraved maps and plates.

Around 1649, Blaeu published a collection of Dutch city maps named Toonneel der Steeden (Views of Cities). In 1651, he was voted into the Amsterdam council. In 1654, Blaeu published the first atlas of Scotland, devised by Timothy Pont.

Blaeu was fiercely competitive with his contemporary Johannes Janssonius as to which of them could make an atlas with a higher quantity of maps. In 1662, Blaeu published the Atlas Maior, it had 11 volumes and included 600 maps. This atlas became a status symbol for those who owned it and was the most expensive book of the 17th century.

A cosmology was planned, but a fire destroyed the studio and all of Blaeu's work in December 1672.

== Death ==
Blaeu died 21 December 1673, in Amsterdam. He is buried in the Amsterdam Westerkerk. He was survived by his son, Joan II, who continued his father's work until 1712.

== See also ==
- History of cartography
