= List of atlases =

This is a list of notable atlases, each a collection of maps, some including statistical data for the regions represented:

== Early modern ==
15th century

- Douce Atlas (nautical atlas)

16th century

- Piri Reis Map (Ottoman Empire, 1513)
- Theatrum Orbis Terrarum (Ortelius, Flanders, 1570–1612)
- Mercator's Atlas (1578)

17th century

- Atlas Novus (Blaeu, Netherlands, 1635–1658; 1645 edition at UCLA)
- Dell'Arcano del Mare (England/Italy, 1645–1661)
- Cartes générales de toutes les parties du monde (France, 1658–1676)
- Klencke Atlas (1660; world's largest book)
- Atlas Maior (Blaeu, Netherlands, 1662–1667)
- Atlante Veneto (Coronelli, Venice, 1691)

18th century

- Britannia Depicta (London, 1720)
- Atlas Nouveau (Amsterdam, 1742)
- Cary's New and Correct English Atlas (London, 1787)

== Modern ==
19th century

- Andrees Allgemeiner Handatlas (Germany, 1881–1939; in the UK as Times Atlas of the World, 1895)
- Atlas do Visconde de Santarem (Paris, 1841, 1842-1844, and 1849)
- Bosatlas (Netherlands 1877–present)
- Cedid Atlas (Istanbul, 1803)o
- Rand McNally Atlas (United States, 1881–present)
- Stielers Handatlas (Germany, 1817–1944)

20th century

- Atlante Internazionale del Touring Club Italiano (Italy, 1927–1978)
- Atlas Mira (Russia, 1937–present)
- Geographers' A–Z Street Atlas (United Kingdom, 1938–present)
- Gran Atlas Aguilar (Spain, 1969/1970)
- Historical Atlas of China (Taiwan, 1980)
- The Historical Atlas of China (China, 1982)
- National Geographic Atlas of the World (United States, 1963–present)
- Pergamon World Atlas (1962/1968)
- Times Atlas of the World (United Kingdom, 1895–present)
- Dorling Kindersley Atlas of the World 1994–present

== Digital atlases ==
- TerraServer-USA/MSR Maps (1998)
- NASA World Wind (2003)
- Yandex Maps (2004)
- Google Maps (2005)
- Baidu Maps (2005)
- WikiMapia (2006)
- North American Environmental Atlas (2005)
- Bing Maps (2010)

== See also ==
- History of cartography
- History of geography
- List of historical maps
- Cartography
- Manifold
- Bird atlas
- Star atlas
