= Aguilar =

Aguilar may refer to:

== People ==
- Aguilar (surname)

== Places ==
=== Spain ===
- Aguilar de Bureba, municipality and town in the province of Burgos, Castile and León
- Aguilar de Campoo, town in the province of Palencia, Castile and León
- Aguilar de Campos, municipality located in the province of Valladolid, Castile and León
- Aguilar de Codés, town and municipality in Navarre
- Aguilar de la Frontera, municipality and town in the province of Córdoba, Andalusia
- Aguilar de Segarra, municipality in the province of Barcelona, Catalonia
- Aguilar del Alfambra, municipality in the province of Teruel, Aragon
- Aguilar del Río Alhama, municipality in La Rioja
- Aguilar (Graus), a locality in Aragon

=== Elsewhere ===
- Aguilar, Colorado, town in Las Animas County, Colorado, USA
- Aguilar, Pangasinan, municipality in the province of Pangasinan, Philippines
- Cape D'Aguilar, cape on Hong Kong Island
- D'Aguilar National Park, national park in Queensland, Australia

== Other ==
- Aguilar (1801 ship) – condemned 1825
- Château d'Aguilar, a Cathar castle in the Aude département, France
- Félix Aguilar Observatory, (Observatorio Félix Aguilar), astronomical observatory in Argentina
- Gran Atlas Aguilar, first comprehensive world atlas of Spanish origin
- Aguilar v. Felton, 473 U.S. 402 (1985), United States Supreme Court decision interpreting the Establishment Clause of the First Amendment to the United States Constitution
- Aguilar v. Texas, 378 U.S. 108 (1964), U.S. Supreme Court decision interpreting and applying the Fourth Amendment to the United States Constitution
- Aguilarite, mineral named for Ponciano Aguilar
