= List of publications of Dorling Kindersley =

This is a list of the books published by Dorling Kindersley, part of Penguin Random House.

== Visual guides ==
Popular titles that DK has published include a series of large-format "visual guides".

=== Non-fiction ===
- 1000 Great Everyday Wines
- 20th Century
- A Visual Encyclopedia, The Arts
- A Visual Encyclopedia, Dinosaur
- A Visual Encyclopedia, Geography
- A Visual Encyclopedia, Ocean
- A Visual Encyclopedia, Science
- A Visual Encyclopedia, of the Periodic Table Elements
- A Visual Encyclopedia, Presidents
- A Visual Encyclopedia, People & Places
- A Visual Encyclopedia, Sharks & Other Deadly Ocean Creatures
- A Visual Encyclopedia, Bible Characters
- A Visual History, The Arts
- A Visual History, Guns
- A Visual History, of Arms & Amour Weapon
- A Visual History, Architecture
- American War of Independence
- Animal Facts
- Antiques Detective
- Artists
- Art That Changed the World
- Arts and Crafts
- Battle At Sea
- Battle
- Battle: 5,000 Years of Combat
- Beer
- Bible Lands
- Big Book of Knowledge
- Big History: Between Nothing and Everything
- Big Ideas Box Philosophy, Psychology, Sociology
- Big Ideas Simply Explained The Anthropology Book
- Big Ideas Simply Explained The Architecture Book
- Big Ideas Simply Explained The Art Book
- Big Ideas Simply Explained The Astronomy Book
- Big Ideas Simply Explained The Bible Book
- Big Ideas Simply Explained The Biology Book
- Big Ideas Simply Explained The Business Book
- Big Ideas Simply Explained The Black History Book
- Big Ideas Simply Explained The Chemistry Book
- Big Ideas Simply Explained The Classical Music Book
- Big Ideas Simply Explained The Crime Book
- Big Ideas Simply Explained The Design Book
- Big Ideas Simply Explained The Ecology Book
- Big Ideas Simply Explained The Economics Book
- Big Ideas Simply Explained The Feminism Book
- Big Ideas Simply Explained The Geography Book
- Big Ideas Simply Explained The History Book
- Big Ideas Simply Explained The Islam Book
- Big Ideas Simply Explained The Law Book
- Big Ideas Simply Explained The LGBTQ+ History Book
- Big Ideas Simply Explained The Literature Book
- Big Ideas Simply Explained The Marvel Book
- Big Ideas Simply Explained The Math Book
- Big Ideas Simply Explained The Medicine Book
- Big Ideas Simply Explained The Military History Book
- Big Ideas Simply Explained The Movie Book
- Big Ideas Simply Explained The Mythology Book
- Big Ideas Simply Explained The Philosophy Book
- Big Ideas Simply Explained The Physics Book
- Big Ideas Simply Explained The Poetry Book
- Big Ideas Simply Explained The Politics Book
- Big Ideas Simply Explained The Psychology Book
- Big Ideas Simply Explained The Religions Book
- Big Ideas Simply Explained The Science Book
- Big Ideas Simply Explained The Shakespeare Book
- Big Ideas Simply Explained The Sherlock Holmes Book
- Big Ideas Simply Explained The Sociology Book
- Big Ideas Simply Explained The Spirituality Book
- Big Ideas Simply Explained The World War I Book
- Big Ideas Simply Explained The World War II Book
- Bird
- Birds of North America
- Birds of Britain & Europe
- BMA A-Z Family Medical Encyclopedia
- BMA Concise Guide to Medicine & Drugs
- BMA Complete Home Medical Guide
- Books that Changed History
- Britain from Above Month by Month
- Buy, Keep or Sell?
- Car
- Cars, Trains, Ships, and Planes
- Children's Illustrated Internet Linked Encyclopedia
- Children's Illustrated Atlas
- Chris Packham's Nature Handbook
- Civilizations: Ten Thousand Years of Ancient History BBC
- Commanders
- Complete Atlas of the World
- Complete Bike Book
- Complete Cat care
- Complete Dog Care
- Complete Family Nutrition
- Complete Flags of the World
- Cook's Book of Ingredients
- Cool Cars
- Classic Cars
- Definitive Illustrated Story, Battle
- Definitive Illustrated Story, Musicals
- Definitive Illustrated Story, Ballet
- Definitive Visual Guide, Animal
- Definitive Visual Guide, Art
- Definitive Visual Guide, Bird
- Definitive Visual Guide, Cat Encyclopedia
- Definitive Visual Guide, Complete Human Body
- Definitive Visual Guide, Dog Encyclopedia
- Definitive Visual Guide, Dinosaurs & Other Prehistoric Life
- Definitive Visual Guide, Flora
- Definitive Visual Guide, Gem
- Definitive Visual Guide, History
- Definitive Visual Guide, Human
- Definitive Visual Guide, Human Anatomy
- Definitive Visual Guide, Jewel, A Celebration of Earth's Treasures
- Definitive Visual Guide, Military History
- Definitive Visual Guide, Music
- Definitive Visual Guide, Ocean
- Definitive Visual Guide, Rock & Minerals
- Definitive Visual Guide, Science
- Definitive Visual Guide, The Stars
- Definitive Visual Guide, The Planets
- Definitive Visual Guide, Universe
- Definitive Visual Guide, World War I
- Definitive Visual Guide, World War II
- Definitive Visual History, Aircraft Book
- Definitive Visual History, Bicycle
- Definitive Visual History, Car
- Definitive Visual History, Classic Car
- Definitive Visual History, Design
- Definitive Visual History, Fashion
- Definitive Visual History, of Life on Earth Prehistoric Life
- Definitive Visual History, Motorbike Book
- Definitive Visual History, Photography
- Definitive Visual History, Tractor Book
- Definitive Visual History, Train Book
- Definitive Visual History, of Armoured Vehicles Tank Book
- Definitive Visual History, War
- Definitive History, of Costume & Style Fashion
- Definitive History, of Motoring Driving
- Definitive Illustrated History, Medicine
- Design
- Dinosaurs and other prehistoric life
- DK Adventures: In The Shadow of The Volcano
- DK Atlas of World History
- Encyclopedia of Aquarium Fish
- Encyclopedia of Herbal Medicine
- Encyclopedia of The Horse
- Encyclopedia of War
- Engineers, From the Great Pyramids to the Pioneers of Space Travel
- Essential World Atlas
- Evolution The Human Story
- Explorers Tales of Adventures & Endurance
- Explanatorium of History
- Explanatorium of Nature
- Explanatorium of Science
- Feed Your Fitness
- First Aid Manual
- First People
- Flight: The Complete History
- Flora
- Formula 1
- Furniture
- Garden Plants for Every Location
- Geography
- Geography of the World
- Great Buildings
- Great City Maps
- Great Maps
- Great Paintings
- Grateful Dead
- Healthy Gut Cookbook
- Herbs & Spices
- History
- History of Britain and Ireland
- History of the World in 1,000 Objects
- History of the World Map by Map
- History: From the Dawn of Civilization to the Present Day
- History Year by Year
- Home Design Workbooks
- Hot Bikes
- How to Train A Superdog
- How to Train a Superpup
- Human
- Human Anatomy
- Illustrated History of Travel, Journey
- Illustrated History of Everything You Eat, Food
- Illustrated History, Firearms
- Illustrated Story of Art
- Incredible Visual Guide To Everything
- Kama Sutra A Position A Day
- Knight
- Knives and Swords
- Knots
- Knowledge Encyclopedia
- Knowledge Encyclopedia Animal!
- Knowledge Encyclopedia Dinosaur!
- Knowledge Encyclopedia History!
- Knowledge Encyclopedia Human Body!
- Knowledge Encyclopedia Ocean!
- Knowledge Encyclopedia Science!
- Knowledge Encyclopedia Space!
- Knowledge Encyclopedia!
- Knowledge Encyclopedia Animals!
- Knowledge Encyclopedia Earth!
- LEGO Absolutely Everything You Need to Know
- LEGO Architecture
- LEGO Minifigure Year by Year
- Machines of War
- Maker Lab
- Mammal Smithsonian
- Modern History in Pictures
- Mountaineers, Great Tales of Bravery and Conquest
- Mushrooms
- Natural History
- Natural History Mammals Carnivores
- Natural Remedies
- Natural Wonders of the World
- Ocean Encyclopedia
- Photography
- Picturepedia
- Planisphere and Starfinder
- Plant
- Plant-Based Cookbook
- Pocket Visual Dictionary
- Pope Francis
- Pregnancy Encyclopedia
- Prehistoric Life
- Queen Elizabeth II and the Royal Family
- RHS A-Z Encyclopedia of Garden Plants
- Rock and Gem
- Rocks & Minerals
- Rolling with the Stones
- RSPB Birdwatching for Beginners
- RSPB Complete Birds of Britain and Europe
- Science But Not As We Know It
- Science Year by Year
- Ship: 5000 Years of Maritime Adventure
- Simply Artificial Intelligence aka Simply AI
- Simply Astronomy
- Simply Climate Changing
- Simply Economics
- Simply Emerging Technology
- Simply Math aka Simply Maths
- Simply Nutrition
- Simply Philosophy
- Simply Physics
- Simply Psychology
- Simply Quantum Physics
- Simply Science
- Simply The Brain
- Space Exploration
- Space: From Earth to the Edge of the Universe
- Super Bug Encyclopedia
- Super Earth Encyclopedia
- Super Dinosaur Encyclopedia
- Super Human Encyclopedia
- Super Nature Encyclopedia
- Super Shark Encyclopedia
- Super Space Encyclopedia
- Timelines of Everything
- Timelines of Science
- Timelines of History
- The Aircraft Book
- The American Revolution
- The Animal Book
- The Bee Book
- The Bicycle Book
- The Blue Planet: A Natural History of the Oceans BBC
- The Brain Book
- The Civil War
- The Classic Car Book
- The Complete Bike Owners Manual
- The Complete Cat Breed Book
- The Complete Dog Breed Book
- The Complete Human Body
- The Concepts Visually Explained, How Philosophy Works
- The Concepts Visually Explained, How Politics Works
- The Facts Visually Explained, How Body Works
- The Facts Visually Explained, How Brain Works
- The Facts Visually Explained, How Business Works
- The Facts Visually Explained, How Food Works
- The Facts Visually Explained, How Management Works
- The Facts Visually Explained, How Money Works
- The Facts Visually Explained, How Psychology Works
- The Facts Visually Explained, How Science Works
- The Facts Visually Explained, How Technology Works
- The Facts Visually Explained, How We are F***ing Up Our Planet
- The Facts Simply Explained, What is Really Happening to Our Planet
- The Techniques & Ideas Visually Explained, How Art Works
- Timelines of Everything
- Timelines of Everyone
- The Illustrated Encyclopedia, of Warfare
- The Illustrated Encyclopedia, of Animal Life Story
- The Illustrated Encyclopedia, of Gardening
- The Essential Visual Guide, Snake
- The Essential Family Guide, Geography of the World
- The Elements Book
- The Horse Encyclopedia
- The Human Brain Book
- The Illustrated Bible
- The Illustrated Mahabharata
- The Iron Road
- The Motorbike Book
- The Planets
- The Rock and Gem Book
- The Science of Animals
- The Science of Ocean
- The Sewing Book
- The Sports Book
- The Story of Food
- The Story of Philosophy
- The Story of the West: A History of the American West and Its People
- The Tool Book
- The Vatican
- The Vietnam War
- The Visual Food Encyclopedia
- The World's Must-See Places: A Look Inside More Than 100 Magnificent Buildings and Monuments
- Through The Animal Kingdom
- Their Lives & Works, Artists
- Their Lives & Works, Philosophers
- Their Lives & Works, Writers
- UFC Encyclopedia
- Ultimate Harley Davidson
- Ultimate Orchid
- Ultimate Spy
- Ultimate Visual Dictionary of Science
- Violent Earth: Volcanoes, Earthquakes, Hurricanes, Mudslides, Tsunamis
- War
- Warrior
- Weapon
- What's Really Happening to Our Planet?
- What's the Point of Maths?
- What's Weird On Earth
- What on Earth?
- Where on Earth?
- Where on Earth Atlas
- Where to Go When Great Britain and Ireland
- Whisky
- Wildlife of the World
- World Cheese Book
- World Religions
- World War I
- World War II
- WWE Encyclopedia
- Yoga for Men
- Zoology

=== Science and nature ===
- A Visual Encyclopedia, Dinosaur
- A Visual Encyclopedia, Ocean
- A Visual Encyclopedia, Science
- A Visual Encyclopedia, of the Periodic Table Elements
- A Visual Encyclopedia, Sharks & Other Deadly Ocean Creatures
- An Anthology of Aquatic Life
- An Anthology of Intriguing Animals
- Animal Facts
- Animal Life
- Big Book of Knowledge
- Big Ideas Simply Explained The Astronomy Book
- Big Ideas Simply Explained The Biology Book
- Big Ideas Simply Explained The Chemistry Book
- Big Ideas Simply Explained The Ecology Book
- Big Ideas Simply Explained The Math Book
- Big Ideas Simply Explained The Physics Book
- Big Ideas Simply Explained The Science Book
- Bird
- Birds of North America
- Birds of Britain & Europe
- Chris Packham's Nature Handbook
- Definitive Visual Guide, Animal
- Definitive Visual Guide, Bird
- Definitive Visual Guide, Dinosaurs & Other Prehistoric Life
- Definitive Visual Guide, Flora
- Definitive Visual Guide, Ocean
- Definitive Visual Guide, Rock & Minerals
- Definitive Visual Guide, Science
- Definitive Visual Guide, The Stars
- Definitive Visual Guide, The Planets
- Definitive Visual Guide, Universe
- Definitive Visual History, of Life on Earth Prehistoric Life
- Encyclopedia of Aquarium Fish
- Evolution The Human Story
- Explanatorium of Nature
- Explanatorium of Science
- Flora
- Geography
- Geography of the World
- Incredible Visual Guide To Everything
- Knowledge Encyclopedia
- Knowledge Encyclopedia Animal!
- Knowledge Encyclopedia Dinosaur!
- Knowledge Encyclopedia Ocean!
- Knowledge Encyclopedia Science!
- Knowledge Encyclopedia Space!
- Knowledge Encyclopedia!
- Knowledge Encyclopedia Earth!
- Mammals Smithsonian
- Mushrooms
- Natural History
- Natural History Mammals Carnivores
- Natural Remedies
- Natural Wonders of the World
- Ocean Encyclopedia
- Picturepedia
- Planisphere and Starfinder
- Plant
- Prehistoric Life
- Rock and Gem
- Rocks & Minerals
- RSPB Birdwatching for Beginners
- RSPB Complete Birds of Britain and Europe
- Science But Not As We Know It
- Science Year by Year
- Space Exploration
- Space: From Earth to the Edge of the Universe
- Super Bug Encyclopedia
- Super Earth Encyclopedia
- Super Dinosaur Encyclopedia
- Super Nature Encyclopedia
- Super Shark Encyclopedia
- Super Space Encyclopedia
- Timelines of Everything
- Timelines of Science
- The Animal Book
- The Bee Book
- The Blue Planet: A Natural History of the Oceans BBC
- The Dinosaur Book
- The Facts Visually Explained, How Science Works
- The Facts Simply Explained, What is Really Happening to Our Planet
- The Illustrated Encyclopedia, of Animal Life Story
- The Essential Visual Guide, Snake
- The Elements Book
- The Planets
- The Rock and Gem Book
- The Science of Animals
- The Science of Ocean
- Through The Animal Kingdom
- Ultimate Orchid
- Ultimate Visual Dictionary of Science
- Violent Earth: Volcanoes, Earthquakes, Hurricanes, Mudslides, Tsunamis
- What's Really Happening to Our Planet?
- What's Weird On Earth
- What on Earth?
- Where on Earth?
- Where on Earth Atlas
- Where on Earth? Dinosaur and Other Prehistoric Creatures Atlas
- Wildlife of the World
- Zoology

=== Fiction ===
- Batman
- Barbie
- Catwoman
- Dark Souls III Collector's Edition
- Disney
- Disney Pirates of the Caribbean
- Disney's Alice in Wonderland
- DC Comics
- DC Comics Super-Villains
- Doctor Who
- Halo Encyclopedia
- Halo 4 The Essential Visual Guide
- Ghost Rider
- Looney Tunes
- Marvel Encyclopedia
- Marvel Avengers
- Noddy
- The Pink Panther
- Pokémon
- Prince of Persia
- Rise of Skywalker: Visual Dictionary
- Spider-Man
- Spider-Man Chronicle
- Smallville
- Stargate
- Star Trek
- Superman
- Transformers
- Ultimate Star Wars
- World of Warcraft

== See also ==
- Booklist
- Eyewitness Books
