= Historical map =

A historical map may be:

- an old map (a map that is itself a historical artefact), see history of cartography
- a map depicting a specific historical period, see historical atlas

== See also ==
- List of historical maps
- List of atlases
