= DermAtlas =

Open-access website devoted to dermatology

DermAtlas is an open-access website devoted to dermatology that is hosted by Johns Hopkins University's Bernard A. Cohen and Christoph U. Lehmann. Its goal is to build a large-high-quality dermatologic atlas, a database of images of skin conditions, and it encourages its users to submit their dermatology images and links for inclusion.

It is edited in a collaborative fashion by physicians around the globe and includes an online Dermatology Quiz, that allows anyone to test their dermatology knowledge.

The database currently includes over 10,500 images and consists of both clinical images and histological images. Great emphasis is placed on dermatological conditions in pediatric patients.
