= Pergamon (disambiguation) =

Pergamon is an ancient Greek city in modern Turkey. Pergamon may also refer to:

== Places ==
- Pergamon Museum, a museum in Berlin housing artifacts from Pergamon and elsewhere
  - Pergamon Altar, a structure from the city now housed in the museum

== Art, entertainment, and media ==
- Pergamon (album), an album by Tangerine Dream
- Pergamon World Atlas, a Polish atlas

== Other uses ==
- Pergamon Press, a publishing house

== See also ==
- Attalid dynasty
- Bergama, the modern Turkish city
- Pergamus
