= Giovanni Bognetti =

Giovanni Bognetti may refer to:

- Giovanni Bognetti (director), Italian film director and screenwriter
- Giovanni Bognetti (historian), Italian historian, geographer and journalist
