= Historical Atlas of China (disambiguation) =

The Historical Atlas of China by Tan Qixiang is an 8-volume work published 1982–88.

Historical Atlas of China may also refer to:

- An Historical Atlas of China (1966), a reprinting of Albert Herrmann's Historical and commercial Atlas of China (1935)
- Historical Atlas of China (1973), published in Taipei based on The Historical Atlas of Eastern Asian History (東洋読史地図; 1941) of Japanese historians (箭内亙; 1875–1926) and Wada Sei (和田清; 1890–1963)
- Historical Atlas of China (1980), 2-volume work published in Taiwan in 1980 and 1983
