= Cedid Atlas =

1803 Ottoman atlas

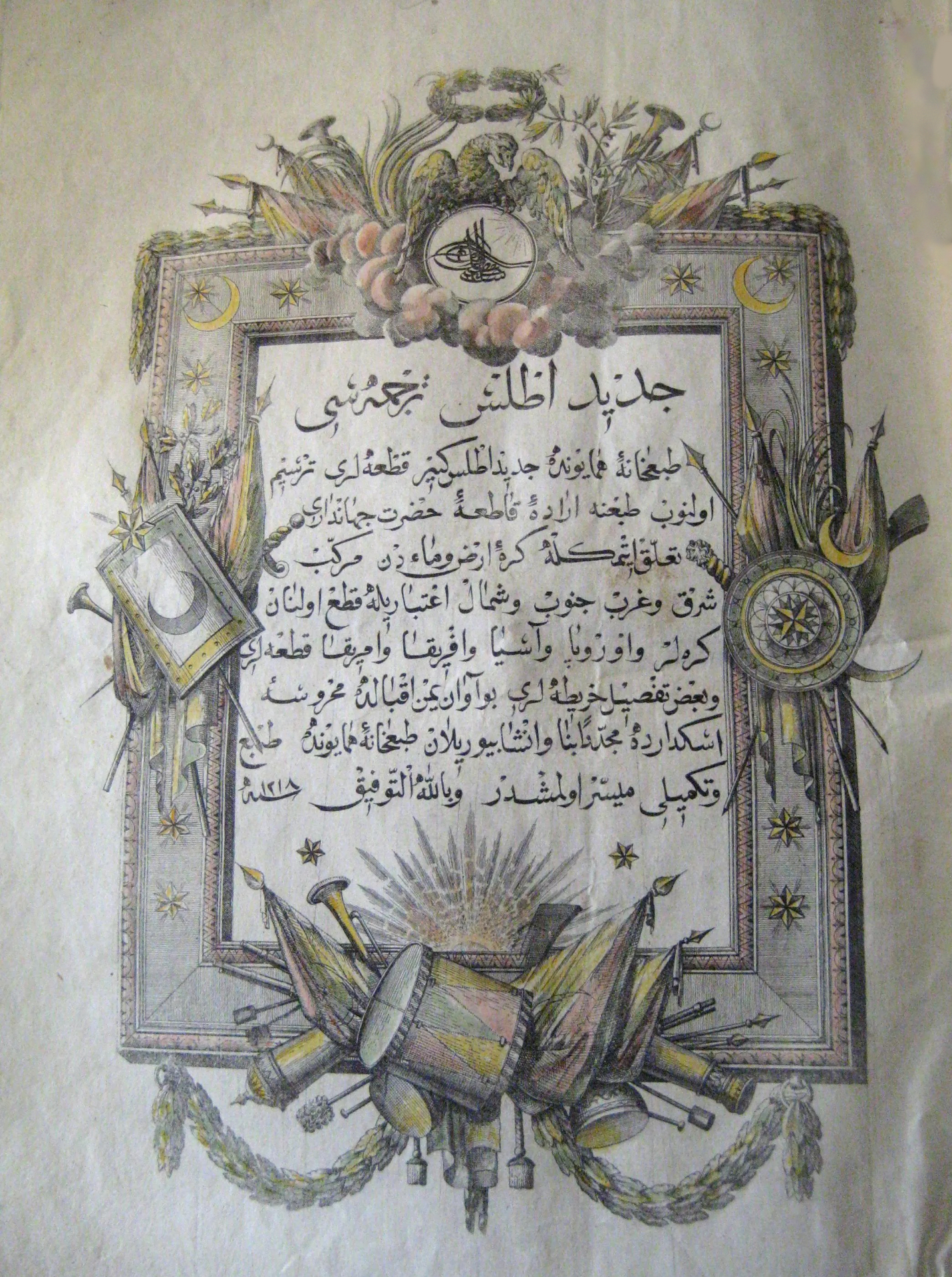
Title Page of the Cedid Atlas (also known as Cedid Atlas Tercümesi)

Cedid Atlas (Ottoman Turkish: جديد اطلس, romanized: Atlas-ı Cedid, lit. 'New Atlas') was the first modern atlas produced in the Muslim world, printed and published in 1803 in Istanbul. The atlas was created by translating and adapting maps from William Faden's General Atlas and the full title of the atlas reads as Cedid Atlas Tercümesi (meaning, literally, "A Translation of a New Atlas") and in most libraries outside Turkey, it is recorded and referenced accordingly.

Although manuscripts and hand-drawn maps were widely available, the Cedid Atlas could only be published in 1803 by Müderris Abdurrahman Efendi in a style based on European sources.

== History ==
The Cedid Atlas is the first modern atlas in the Muslim world, printed and published in 1803 in Constantinople, then the capital of the Ottoman Empire. The full title name of the atlas reads as Cedid Atlas Tercümesi (meaning, literally, "A Translation of a New Atlas") and in most libraries outside Turkey, it is recorded and referenced accordingly.

Although manuscripts and hand-drawn maps were widely available throughout the Muslim world, the massive printing of books started only in 1729 by Ibrahim Muteferrika and the Cedid Atlas could only be published in 1803 by Müderris Abdurrahman Efendi in a style based on European sources.

The Cedid Atlas includes a monochrome celestial chart and 24 hand-coloured copper engraved maps of various parts of the world; the celestial chart and maps measure at least (53 cm by 72 cm) and all the maps are actually adaptations of William Faden's General Atlas. The maps are preceded by a (1+79) page-long treatise of geography, "Ucalet-ül Coğrafiye" by Mahmud Raif Efendi and a title page. The "Ucalet-ül Coğrafiye" of Mahmud Raif Efendi was printed one year later, in 1804, and bound together with the atlas.

From a point of view of art, the atlas is notable for the color of the maps as well as the beauty of the script on the maps.

The Cedid Atlas was published in parallel with the developments of the Ottoman Empire's Nizam-ı Cedid, the "New-Order" or the "New System" ("Cedid" means "new" and "Nizam" means "system", "regime", or "order") and its title-name reflects this clearly. The atlas was new in terms of cartographical knowledge and well suited to the new system which tried to introduce new institutions into the Ottoman Empire while trying to replace existing ones with contemporary counterparts from the West. Introduced by the ruling padishah (the sultan) of the Ottoman Empire, Selim III, the "New-Order" included a series of reforms which mainly modernized and changed the structure of the then existing Ottoman army and changed the administrative structure of the Empire. It was an effort to catch up with technical, military, economic, and administrative achievements of the West against which the Ottoman Empire was losing grounds since the 17th century. New military and engineering schools were established and governmental units related with the foreign relations and affairs were re-organized to align with the new system. For these schools, governmental units, and the wholly re-organized army reformed according to the European practice, a new understanding and applications of geography of the standards of the West were necessary and the Cedid Atlas was translated and printed for this purpose.

Only 50 copies of this atlas (measuring 36 cm x 53 cm) were printed at the press. A copy was presented to Selim III; several copies were also presented to the high-ranking officials of the Empire, some were reserved for the library of Muhendishane (military engineering school of the time), and the remaining were reserved for sale. However, during the "Alemdar Vakası", an uprising of the janissaries in Constantinople during November 15–18, 1808, a fire at the warehouse of the press destroyed an unknown (unaccounted) number of the copies reserved for sale. Based on several estimates and accounting for the single maps (torn-out from bound volumes of the atlas) sold or being sold worldwide, it is believed that a maximum of 20 complete examples could be present in libraries or in private collections whereas some sources suggest that there exist only 10 complete and intact copies in the world. As such, it's one of the rarest printed atlases of historical value.

== Other names ==
A few sources outside Turkey and the Muslim world also refer to this atlas as the New Great Atlas. In Turkey, since the printing press of the book was located in the historical Üsküdar (Scutari) region (now a municipality) of Istanbul, the atlas sometimes is referred to as the Üsküdar Atlası.

== Existing copies ==
These are the only 12 complete copies known to exist in the world:

1. Turkey - Topkapı Sarayı (Topkapı Palace) - 1 copy - Complete
2. Turkey - Library of the Istanbul Technical University (İstanbul Teknik Üniversitesi, formerly known as ""Engineering School (Mühendislik Mektebi")) - 2 copies - Complete (presence of copies are not confirmed)
3. Turkey - Library of the Boğaziçi University (Boğaziçi Üniversitesi, formerly known as Robert College) - 3 copies - Complete (presence of only 1 copy is confirmed)
4. Turkey - Municipality of Üsküdar(Üsküdar Belediyesi) - 1 copy - Complete
5. United States - Library of Congress - 1 copy - Complete
6. United States - Princeton University Library - 1 copy - Complete
7. Netherlands - Leiden University Library - 1 copy - Complete
8. United Arab Emirates - Antiquarian bookseller; Eqtna for Rare Books. The copy was displayed for sale at the Sharjah Book Fair 2016. - 1 copy - Complete
9. Swann Auction Galleries, New York - 1 complete copy sold on 26 May 2016.

(Contrary to sources, on-line library search at the library of Boğaziçi University shows only 1 copy according to the records, and an on-line search at the library of the Istanbul Technical University shows no copies according to records. WorldCat union catalogue search of all the libraries confirms this result. Accordingly, there are only 10 complete and intact copies confirmed to exist in the world.)

These are the incomplete copies known to exist in the world:

1. United States - John Carter Brown Library (Brown University) - 1 copy (missing 2 maps)
2. United States - Newberry Library - 1 copy (missing 1 map and also 1 available map is from another copy)
3. Turkey - Yapı Kredi Sermet Çifter Araştırma Kütüphanesi - 1 copy (missing several maps)
4. Turkey - Bursa İnebey Kütüphanesi - 1 copy (missing several maps)
5. Norway - Nasjonalbiblioteket (National Library of Norway) - 1 copy (missing 2 maps)
6. Sweden - Kungliga Biblioteket (Royal Library of Sweden) - 1 copy (missing the title page)
7. Austria - Antikvariat InLibris, Vienna - 1 copy (Missing the celestial chart).
8. United Kingdom - Bodleian Library - 1 copy (missing celestial map only)

The following libraries possess very limited portions of the atlas :

1. Bibliothèque nationale de France owns the initial (1+79) page-long geographical treatise "Ucalet-ül Coğrafiye" and one map only, title page and the remaining maps of the atlas are missing.
2. National Library of Australia owns only two maps of the atlas with all the rest missing.

Occasionally, single maps of the Cedid Atlas are presented for sale by on-line book sellers or auctioneers.

== Maps in the Cedid Atlas ==
In addition to the (53 cm x 72 cm) monochrome celestial map, there are 24 coloured maps in the atlas; some of them are larger than (53 cm x 72 cm). In order of appearance, these maps show:

1. Eastern Hemisphere and Western Hemisphere
2. South Pole and North Pole
3. The World
4. Europe (including Iceland)
5. Anatolia, Black Sea, Aegean Sea, Balkan Peninsula, (heel of) Italy, Iraq/Syria/Lebanon/Jordan/Palestine/Cyprus/Crete (in the south)
6. Adriatic Coast, Italy, Southern France, Iberian Peninsula, Libya/Tunis/Algeria (in the south)
7. Anatolia (the) Black Sea, Crimea, Southern Ukraine, (north of) Balkan Peninsula to Hungary
8. Western Anatolia, Aegean Sea, Crete (in the south), Greece
9. England (and Wales)
10. Scotland and Scottish Islands
11. The Low Countries : Hanau, Luxembourg, Brabant, Flanders, Northern France
12. France (at the time of the monarchy)
13. The English Channel and the Channel Islands, Western France Coast
14. France (at the time of the republic)
15. Germany (from Brandenburg to Braunschweig)
16. Poland, Prussia, Lithuania (to the north)
17. Continent of Asia
18. Azerbaijan, Armenia, Western Iran, Iraq/Syria/Lebanon/Jordan/Palestine/Cyprus (in the south), Anatolia, Kurdistan, Al Jazzira
19. Continent of Africa
20. River Nile in Egypt in detail (including the Nile Delta)
21. Continents of America (North, Central, South) and (part of) Pacific Ocean
22. Eastern North America
23. Central/South America (Guyana) Coast
24. The Lesser Antilles (including) Puerto Rico, Trinidad, Tobago

== Paper analysis ==
Examination of the watermarks lead some Princeton University professors believe that the paper is of Russian origin, but John Delaney, the historical maps curator for the Princeton University Library, believes it is possibly from Venice, Italy.

== Gallery ==
Pages from the Cedid Atlas
World map

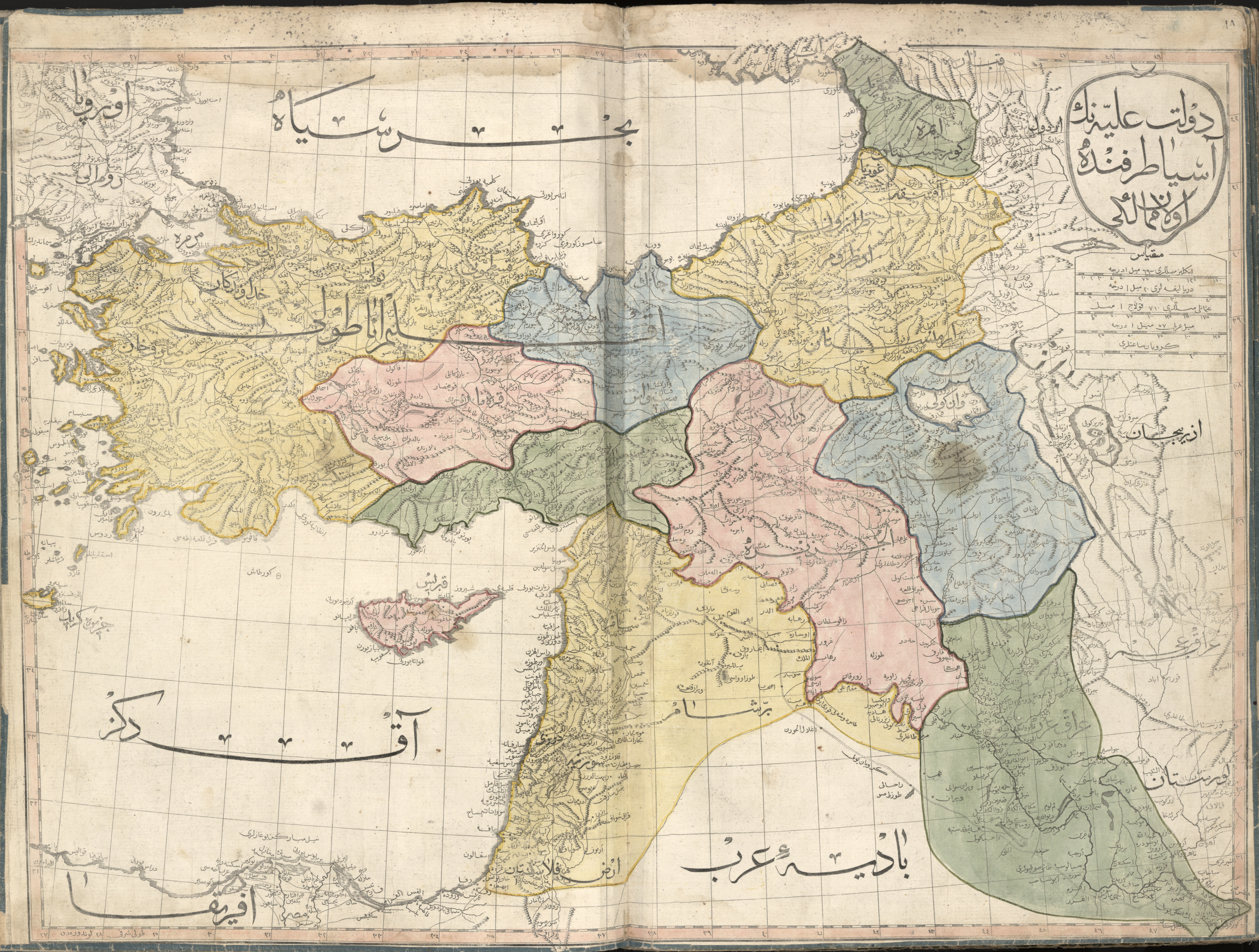
The Ottoman controlled Western Asia

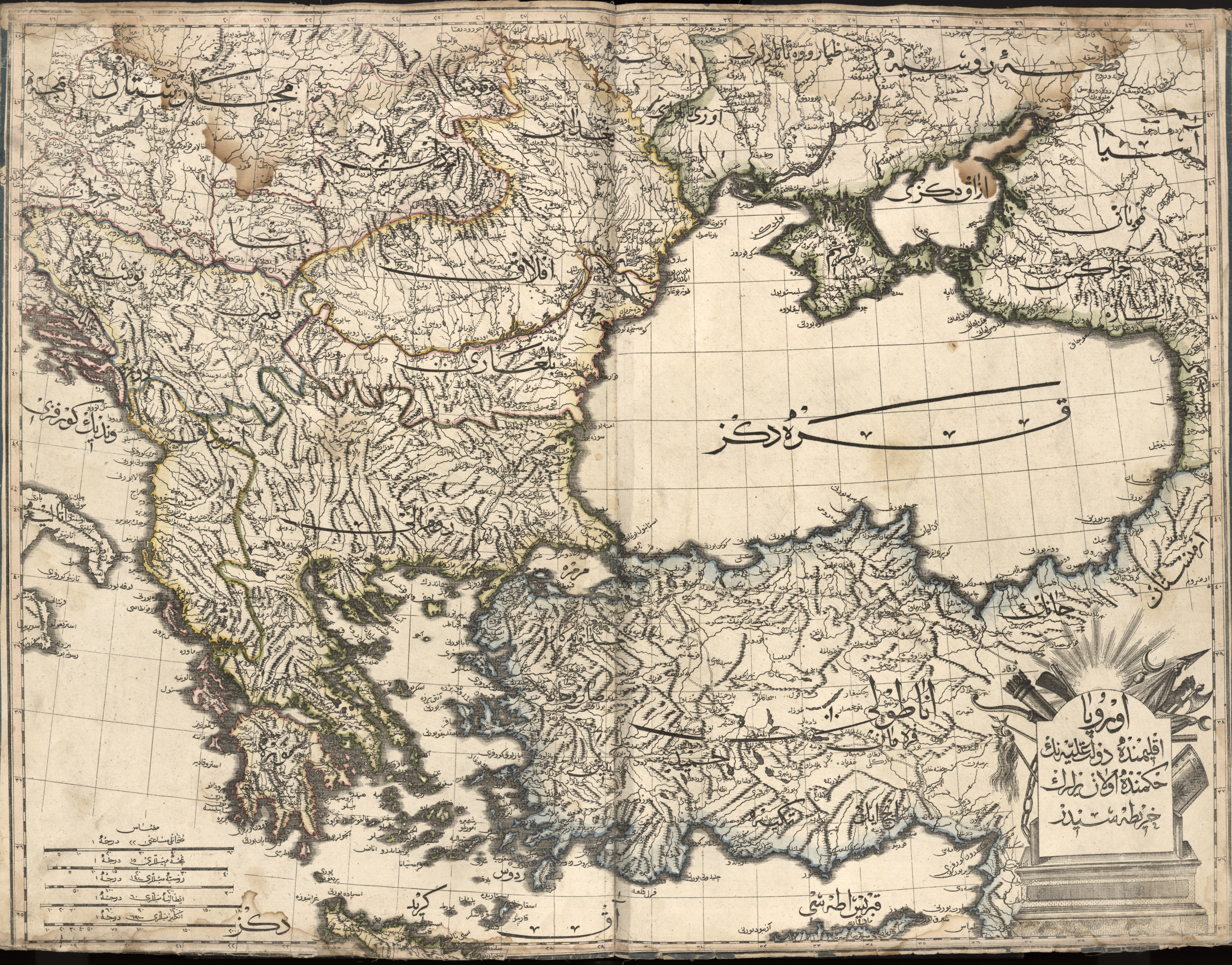
Balkans and Anatolia

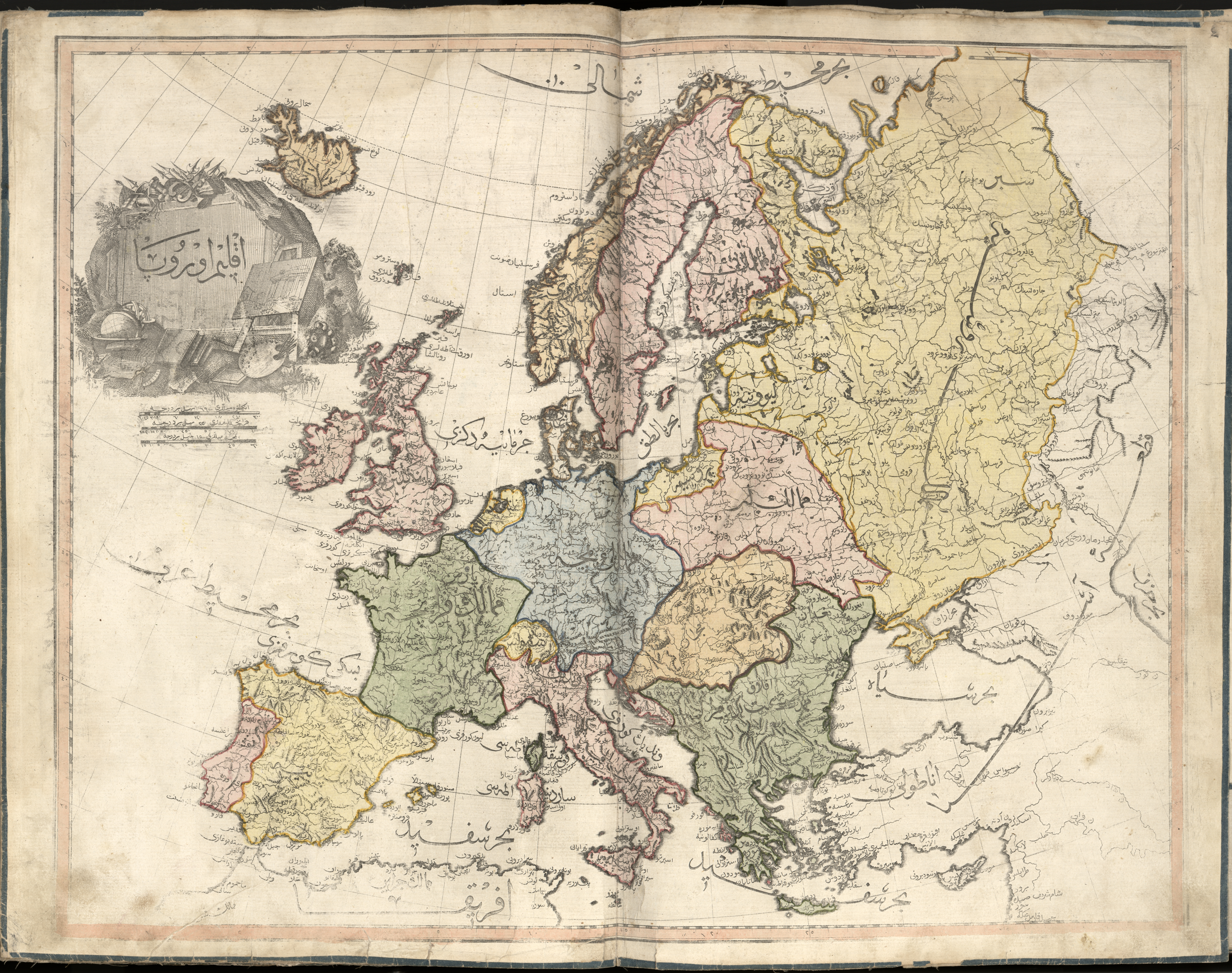
Europe, including Ottoman Southeast Europe

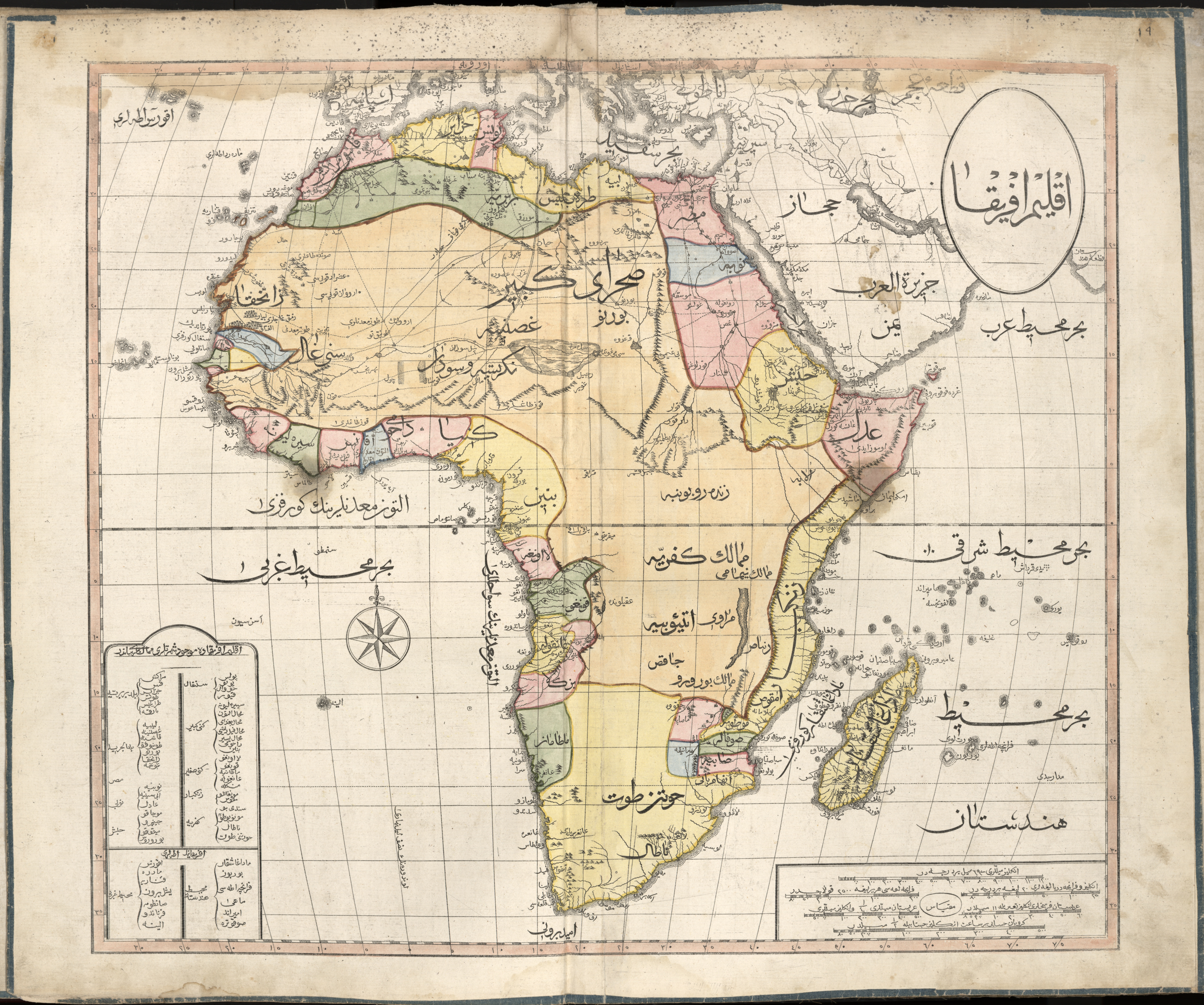
Africa, including Ottoman North Africa

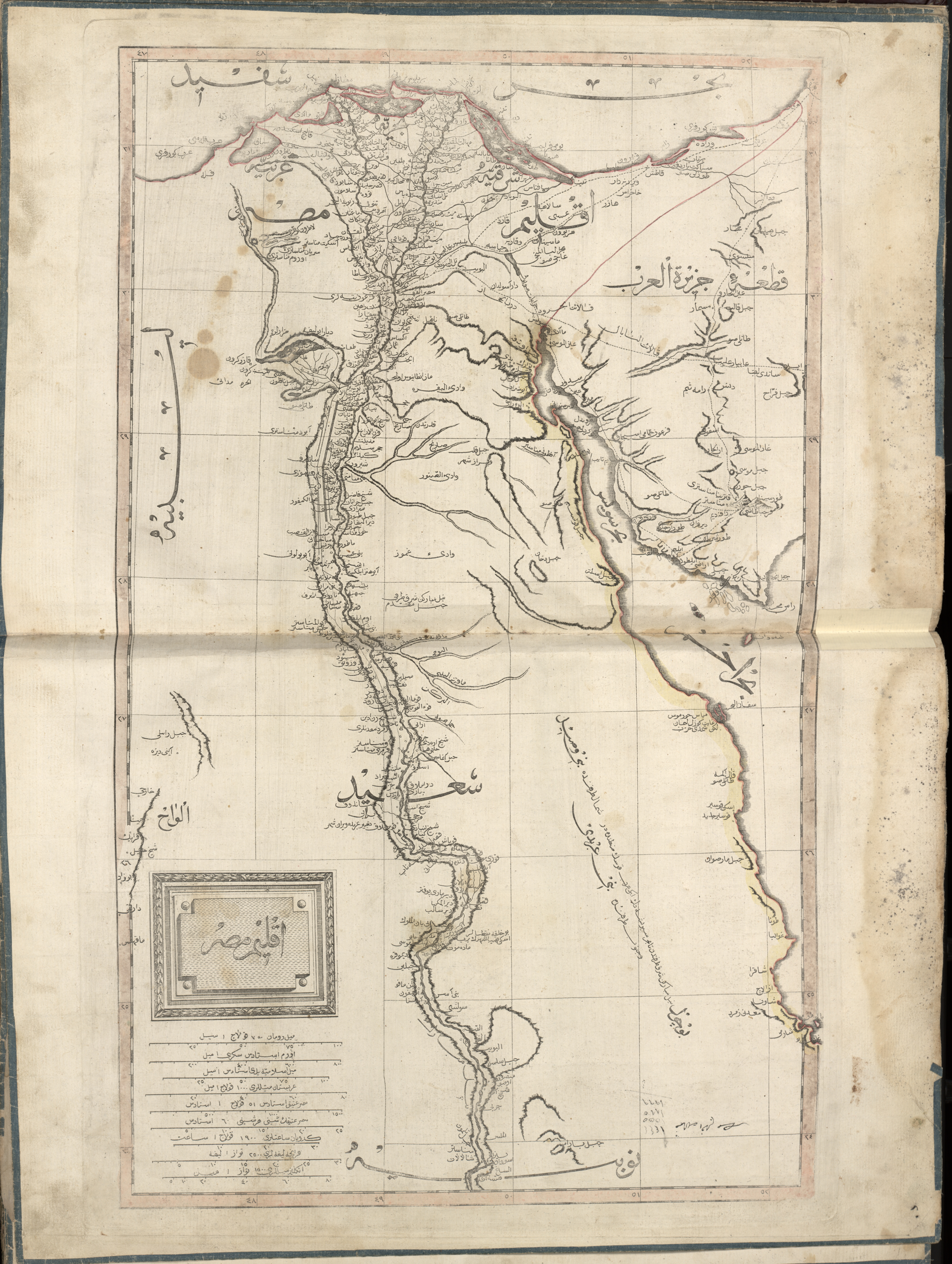
Ottoman Egypt

== Articles and papers ==
- University of Chicago - European Cartographers and the Ottoman World (1500-1750)
- Turkish Cultural Foundation - Turkish Graphic Arts
- Jerusalem Quarterly - Shifting Ottoman Conceptions of Palestine : Ethnography and Cartography
- İstanbul Üniversitesi Dergisi - Article in Turkish by Cengiz Orhonlu (in Turkish)
- İstanbul Üniversitesi Dergisi - Article in Turkish by Deniz Ekinci (in Turkish)

== Books ==
- The Ottoman Centuries: The Rise and Fall of the Turkish Empire. Kinross, Patrick. Perennial, London, 1977.
- İmparatorluğun En Uzun Yüzyılı. Ortaylı, İlber. Hil Yayinları, İstanbul, 1983. (in Turkish)
- Military, Administrative, and Scholarly Maps and Plans. Karamustafa, Ahmet T. In "The History of Cartography, Vol. 2, Book 1: Cartography in the Traditional Islamic and South Asian Societies, edited by J. B. Harley and David Woodward, pp. 209–28", University of Chicago Press, Chicago, 1992.
- Türk Bilim ve Matbaacılık Tarihinde Mühendishane, Mühendishane Matbaası ve Kütüphanesi (1776-1826). Beydilli, Kemal. Eren Yayıncılık, İstanbul, 1995. (in Turkish)
- Mühendishane ve Üsküdar Matbaalarında Basılan Kitapların Listesi ve Bir Katolog. Beydilli, Kemal. Eren Yayıncılık, İstanbul, 1997. (in Turkish)
- History of the Ottoman Empire, Volume 2. Shaw, S.J. and Shaw, E.Z., Cambridge University Press, Cambridge, 1997.
- Mahmud Raif Efendi ve Nizâm-ı Cedîd'e Dair Eseri. Beydilli, Kemal & Şahin, İlhan. Türk Tarih Kurumu Yayınları, Ankara, 2001. (in Turkish)

== See also ==
- Map
- Atlas
- Cartography
- History of cartography
- Map collection
- Piri Reis map
- Book collecting
- Incunable
- Printing
- Printing press
- History of printing
- Geography
- Geography and cartography in medieval Islam
- Table of historical maps
- List of atlases
