= Environmental change =

Environmental change is a change or disturbance of the environment most often caused by human influences and natural ecological processes. Environmental changes include various factors, such as natural disasters, of human interference, or animal interaction. Environmental change encompasses not only physical changes, but also factors like an infestation of invasive species.

== See also ==
- Climate variability and change
- Environmental degradation
- Atlas of Our Changing Environment
- Phenotypic plasticity
