= Douce Atlas =

Early 15th-century nautical atlas

The Douce Atlas is an early 15th-century nautical atlas by an anonymous Italian cartographer, currently held (MS Douce 390) by the Bodleian Library in Oxford, created by an anonymous Italian cartographer. No attribution to known cartographers or place of origin. Venice and Genoa have been suggested. The Bodleian-Douce Atlas is currently held (Ms. Douce 390) by the Bodleian Library at the University of Oxford in Oxford, UK.

The Bodleian-Douce atlas is composed of six portolan charts, with each chart covering two folios:

- P.1 - Black Sea.
- P.2 - East Mediterranean
- P.3 - Adriatic Sea and Sicily
- P.4 - Central Mediterranean
- p. 5 - West Mediterranean and northwest Africa down to Mogador
- p. 6. - North Atlantic (including British isles)
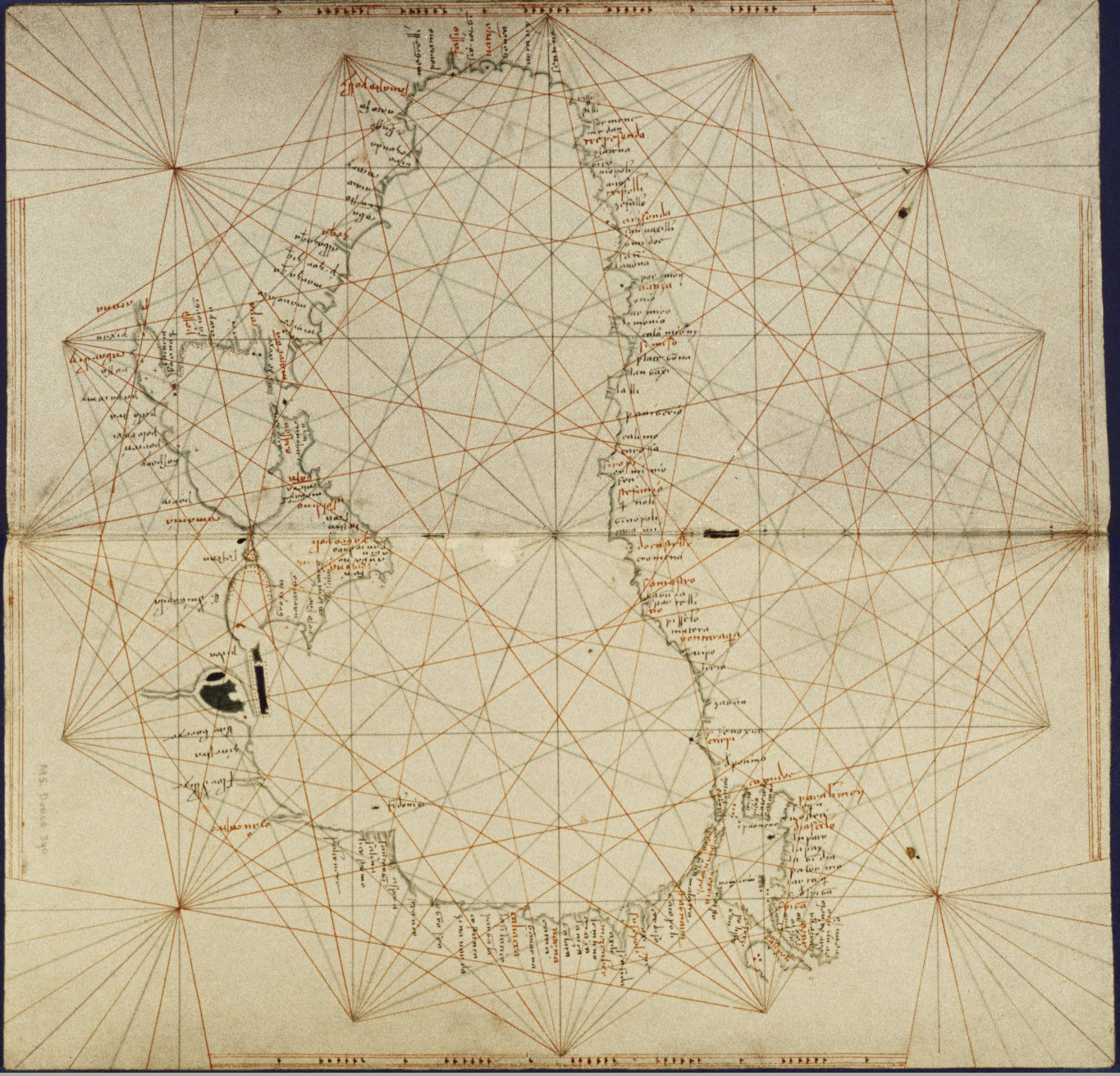
p. 1 (Black Sea)

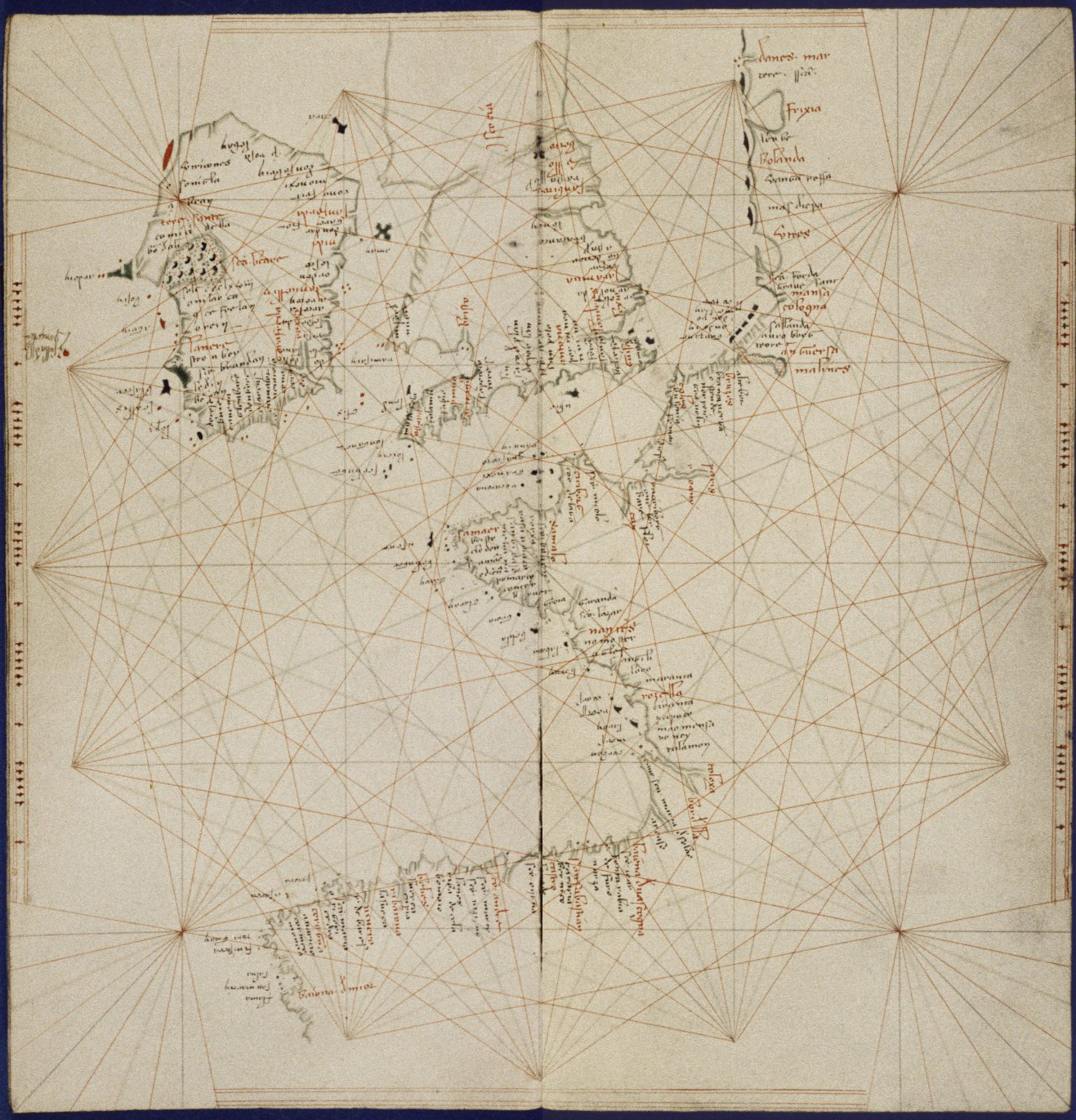
p. 6 (North Atlantic, incl. British isles)

== Sources ==
- "Douce atlas": exhibition of MS Douce 390 at Bodleian Library, Oxford.
- Campbell, T. (2011) "Anonymous works and the question of their attribution to individual chartmakers or to their supposed workshops", (online, accessed July 14, 2011)
