= Cartopedia =

Atlas computer program

Cartopedia: The Ultimate World Reference Atlas was an atlas program originally published by Dorling Kindersley Multimedia in 1995. It featured interactive world maps and graphs and charts of international statistics, and served as a reference guide for students and geographers.
