= Atlas of Our Changing Environment =

Atlas series by the UN Environment Programme

Atlas of Our Changing Environment is a series of atlases published beginning in 2005 by the United Nations Environment Programme. The series includes:

- One Planet Many People: Atlas of Our Changing Environment (2005)
- Africa Lakes: Atlas of Our Changing Environment (2006)
- Africa: Atlas of Our Changing Environment (2008)

These publications primarily make use of historical and recent satellite data alongside maps and photos to highlight areas of environmental change around the globe.
