= Giovanni Bognetti (historian) =

Italian historian, geographer and journalist

- Born: 8 December 1868; Milan, Kingdom of Italy
- Died: 9 January 1935 (aged 66); Milan, Kingdom of Italy
- Occupations: Historian, geographer, journalist

Giovanni Bognetti (8 December 1868 – 9 January 1935) was an Italian historian, geographer and journalist.

== Biography ==
Born in Milan in 1868 to Giuseppe Bognetti and Liduina Arganini, he graduated in literature from the Accademia scientifico-letteraria in 1891 and taught history at the "Alessandro Manzoni" high school. He later moved to the "Bognetti-Boselli" institute, where he became principal and remained until 1926.

He devoted himself to historical studies, publishing various monographs with the Archivio Storico Lombardo, and was a corresponding member of the Regio Istituto Lombardo di Scienze e Lettere and the Regia Deputazione di Storia Patria per le Province Lombarde. From 1904 to 1913, he was president of the Circolo Filologico Milanese, and in 1914, he became a councilor of the Società Storica Lombarda. Among other positions he held, he was vice-president of the Ente Nazionale per le Industrie Turistiche, a councilor of the Automobile Club d'Italia, and a member of the Council of Research.

In 1918, he joined the board of the Touring Club Italiano and from 1919 directed the magazine Le Vie d'Italia. In 1926, he became president of the club, and among his major initiatives were the completion of the Atlante Internazionale (1927), after the death of Luigi Vittorio Bertarelli, who had been its creator; the publication of the Guida d'Italia (1929); the collection of illustrations Attraverso l'Italia; the Guida dei Campi di Battaglia in seven volumes; and the Carta delle Zone Turistiche d'Italia.

He died in Milan on 9 January 1935.
