= Atlas Linguisticus =

Atlas of the world's languages

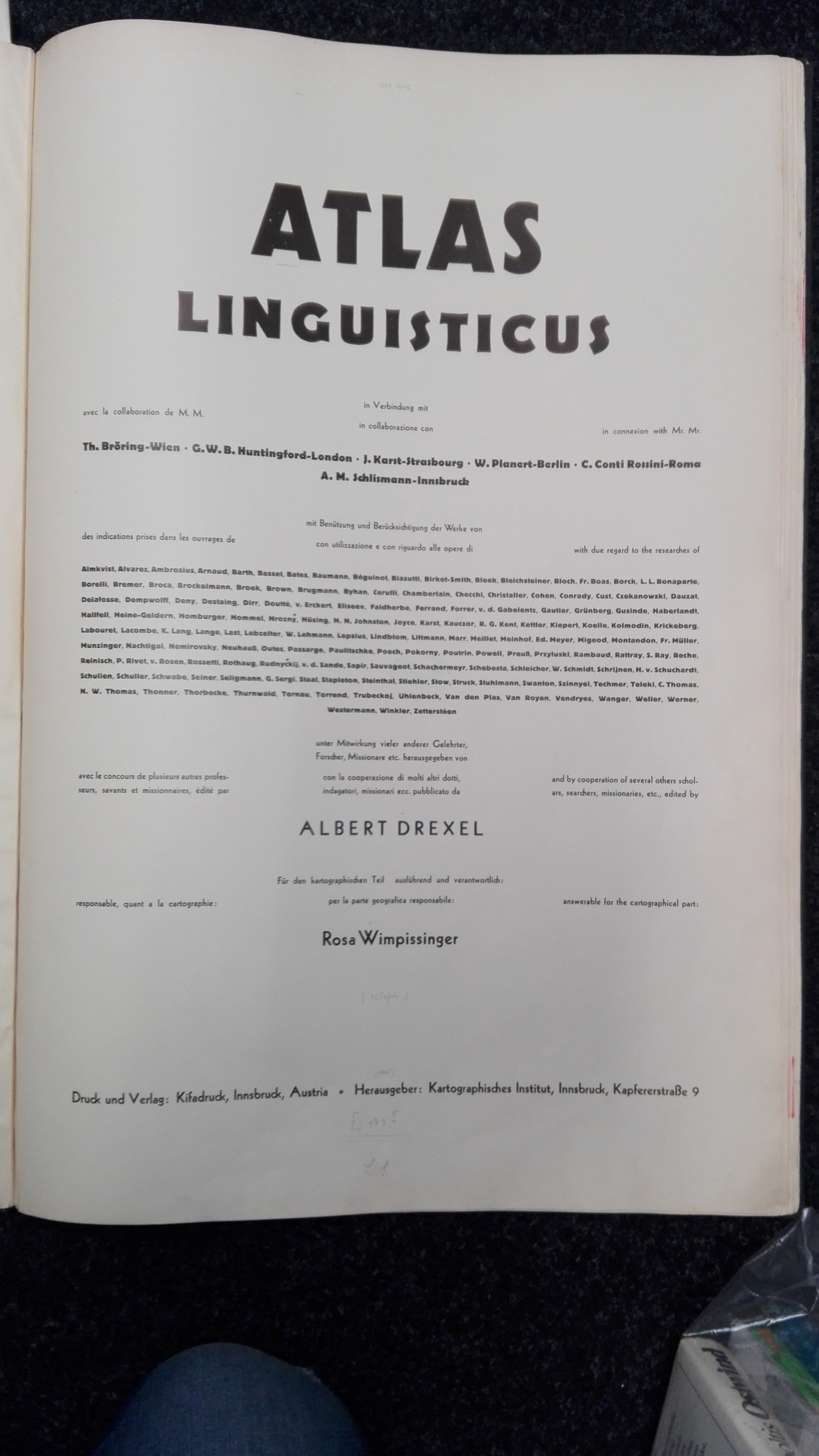
- Title Page
- Author: Albert Drexler, Rosa Wimpissinger
- Publisher: Kifadruck
- Publication date: 1934

Atlas Linguisticus is an atlas of the world's languages published in 1934 in Innsbruck by priest and researcher Albert Drexel (1889–1977) and cartographer Rosa Wimpissinger. The atlas consists of eight full-page (65 cm by 95 cm) maps and over 50 other maps, so for a total of 29 map pages that are folded into 48 66 cm by 45 cm book pages.

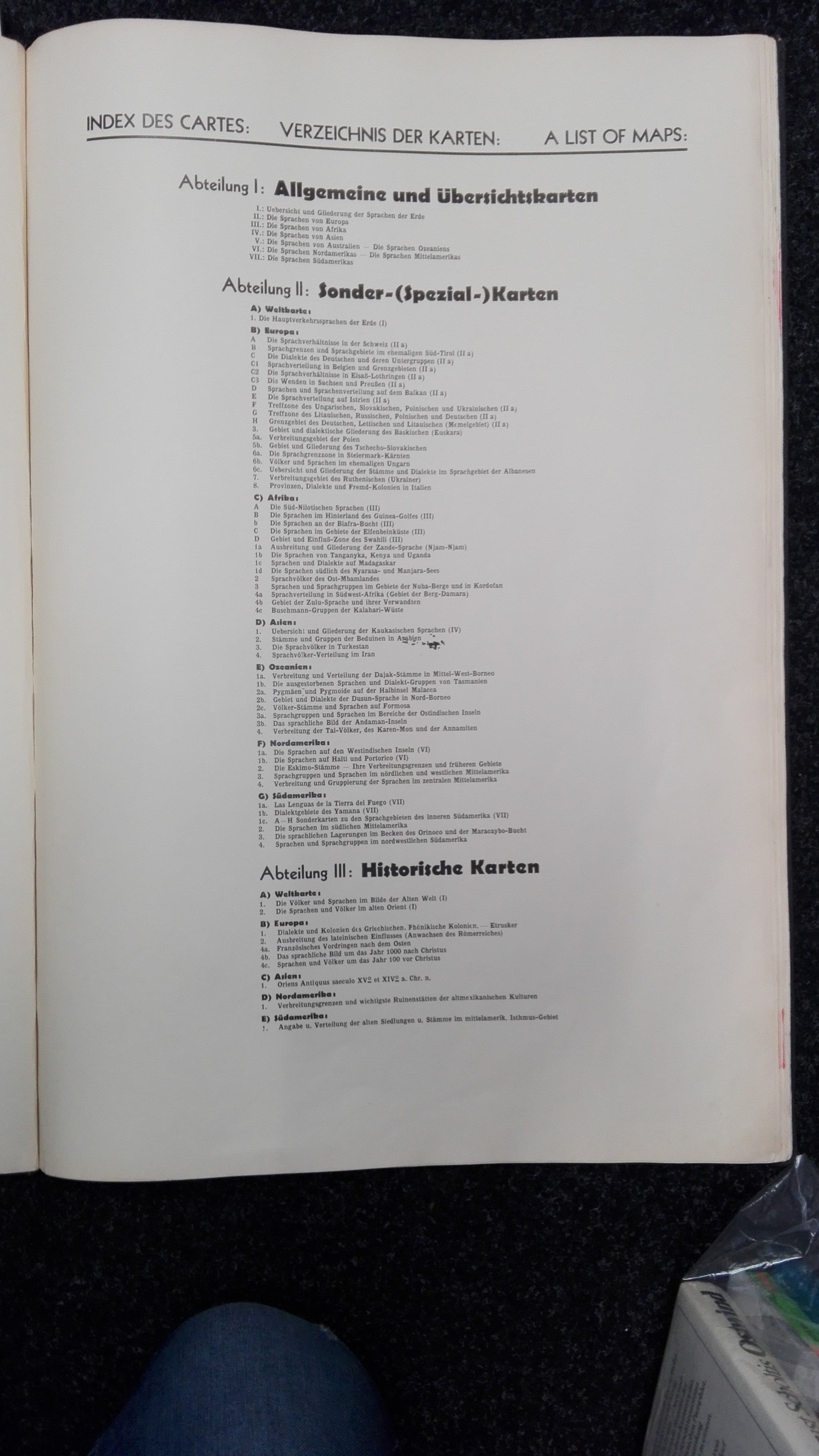
Atlas Linguisticus, 1934, Contents

== Table of Contents ==
- Part I: General and Overview Maps
  - I The Languages of the World (1 map)
  - II The Languages of Europe (1 map)
  - III The Languages of Africa (1 map)
  - IV The Languages of Asia (1 map)
  - V The Languages of Australia and The Languages of Oceania (1 map)
  - VI The Languages of North America and The Languages of Central America (1 map)
  - VII The Languages of South America (1 map)

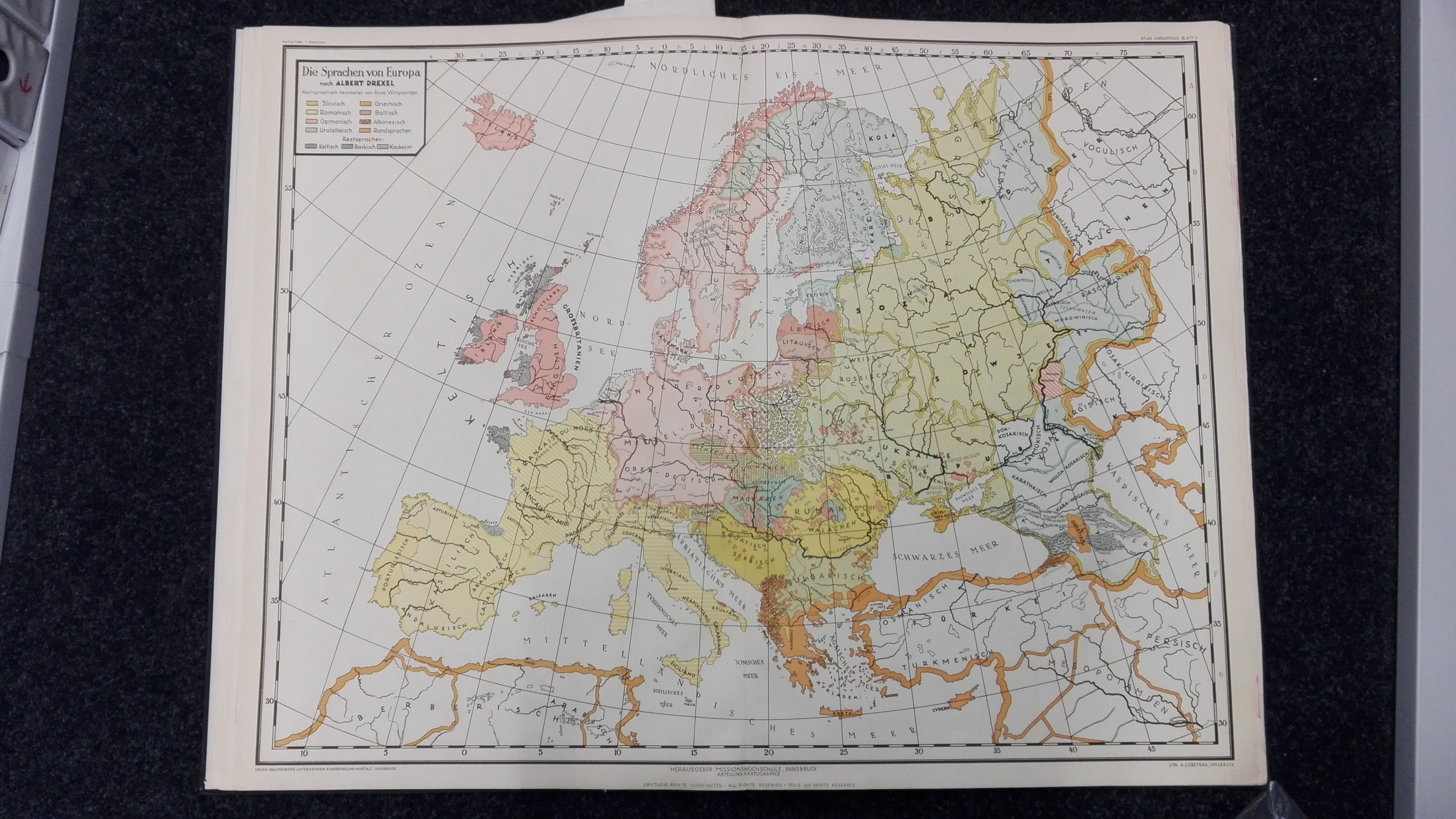
Languages of Europe, 1934

- Part II Thematic Maps
  - A Map of the World (1 map)
  - B Europe (19 maps)
  - C Africa (14 maps)
  - D Asia (4 maps)
  - E Oceania (8 maps)
  - F North America (5 maps)
  - G South America (6 maps)

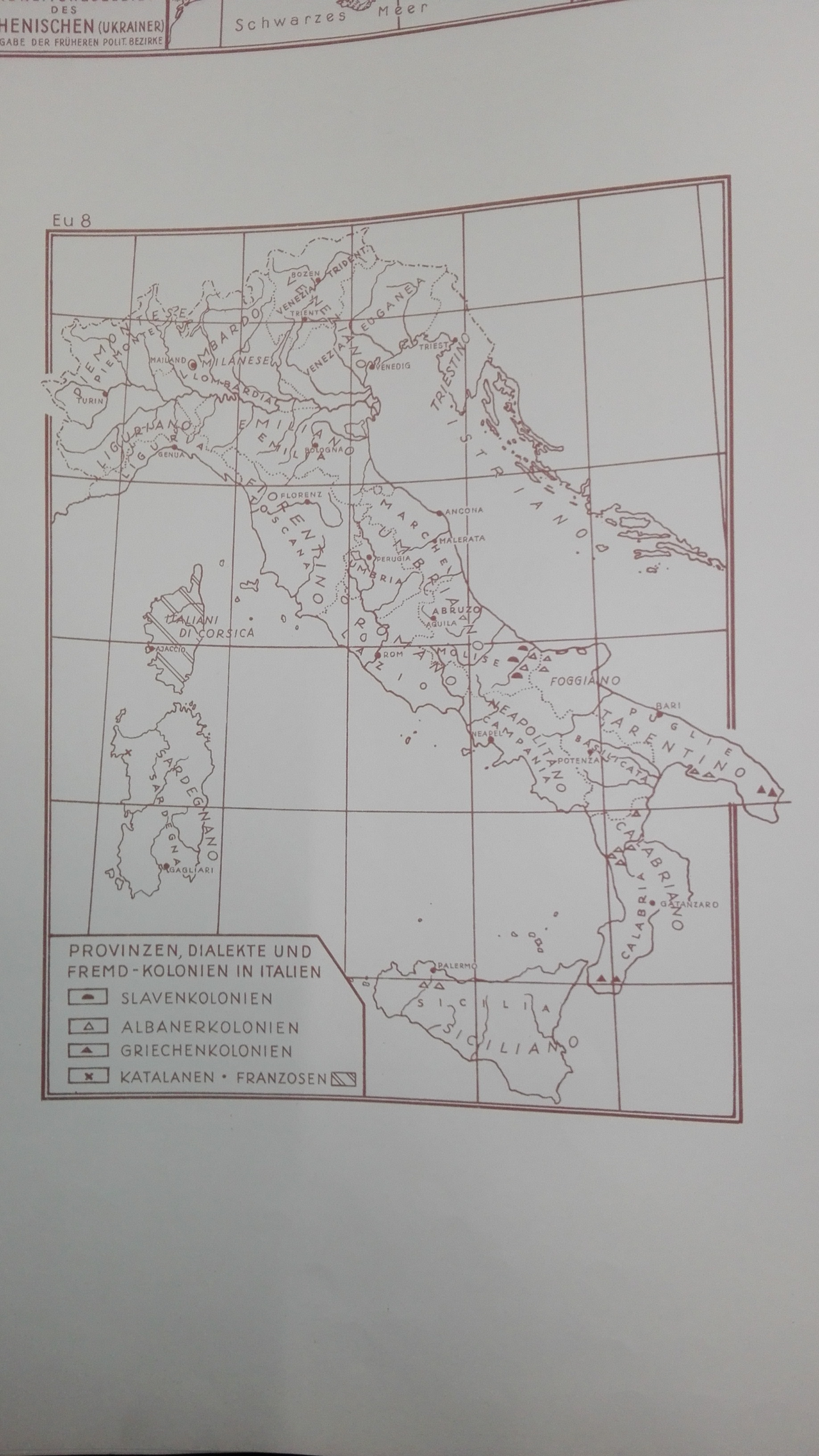
Italian dialects and non-Italian-speaking settlements

- III Part Historical Maps
  - A Map of the World (2 maps)
  - B Europe (5 maps)
  - C Asia (1 map)
  - D North America (1 map)
  - E South America (1 map)

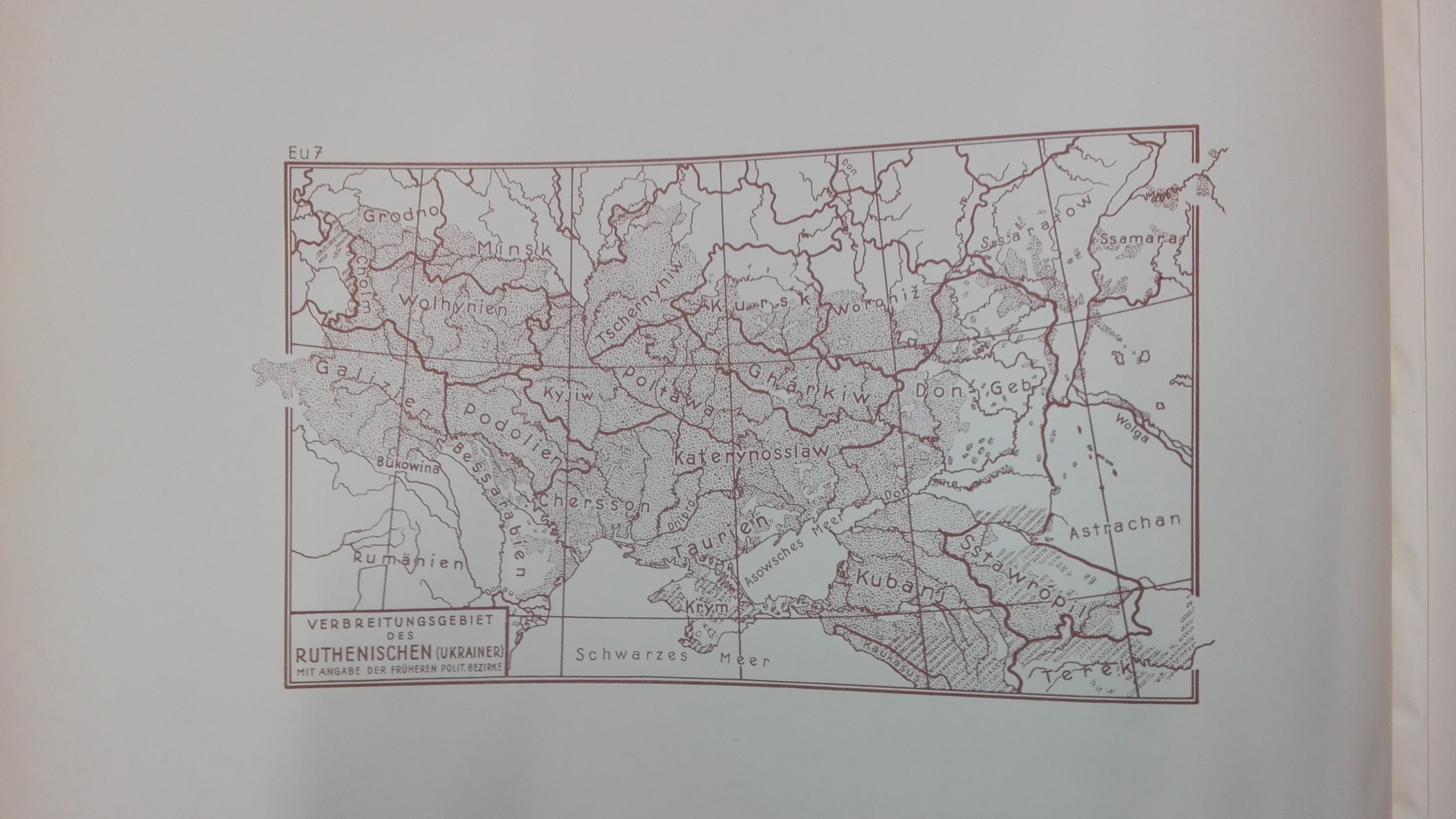
Ruthenian (Ukrainian) language
