= Atlas do Visconde de Santarém =

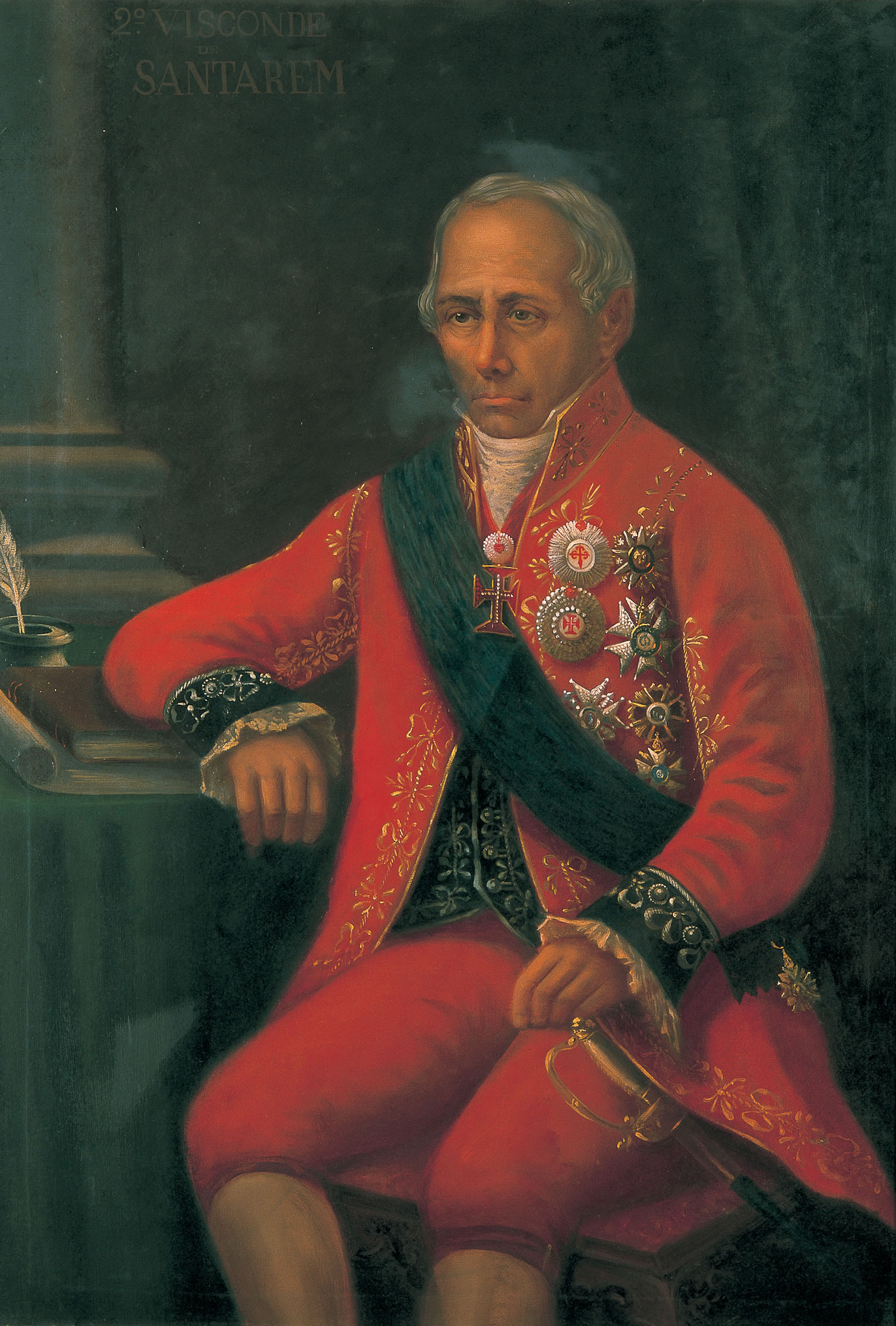
The 2nd Viscount of Santarém, c. 1850 (Lisbon Geographic Society)

The Atlas do Visconde de Santarém known sometimes in English as the Viscount of Santarém's world atlas, is an important compendium lithographic reproductions of medieval European maps and navigation charts.

There were three editions, all published in Paris: 1841, 1842–1844 with far fewer plates, and in 1849, the third edition and considered to be the best. This edition contains 145 maps on 77 plates, arranged in 4 parts.

== Biographical ==
Manuel Francisco de Barros e Sousa de Mesquita de Macedo Leitão e Carvalhosa, second Viscount of Santarém, was born in Lisbon on 18 November 1791, the son of a prominent Portuguese nobleman. A staunch supporter of the monarchy he was, while still young, appointed Guarda-Mor (state archivist) of the royal archives at the Torre do Tombo in Lisbon, and in 1827 even became Minister of the Interior and of Marine and Overseas Territories; he was to hold neither post for long. His support of the Miguelist (absolutist) side in the Civil War meant he was relieved from his function as royal archivist in 1833, forced into exile, and finally settled down in Paris, from where he never returned to Portugal – although he was later rehabilitated, and in 1842 even restored to his position as Guarda-Mor. In Paris he devoted himself entirely to historical and cartographical studies, focusing on the Age of Discovery and the Portuguese role in it. Numerous publications resulted from this activity, among them first and foremost his 'Essai sur I'Histoire de la Cosmographie et de la Cartographie pendant le Moyen-âge' (1849–1852) and the famous accompanying 'Atlas composé de Mappemondes, de Portulans et de cartes hydrographiques et historiques depuis le VIe jusq’au XVIIe siècle...' He lived for many years in his house in the Rue Blanche 47, where he died from tuberculosis on 17 January 1856.

As a statesman Santarém may have been anything but a success, but as a man of science he has rendered his country and the science of historical cartography many and important services; it was in fact he who coined the term 'cartography' and who gave historical cartography a sound scientific basis. The constitutional Portuguese government, with whom he – in spite of his Absolutist inclinations – was on very good terms, repeatedly called in his collaboration and his knowledge of the history of cartography and discovery whenever conflicts arose with other powers, regarding Portuguese claims to territories in Africa. The Government even supported financially – although in an insufficient measure – the publication of his works and especially of the 'Atlas', which was beset with many financial problems, and which he, at the end of his life, considered to be far from accomplished. Also his 'Essai' has remained a 'torso': of the six volumes he planned to compile only three were actually published, extending only to the 15th century. This is all the more regrettable as a number of the maps and charts in it, which he intended to discuss in the remaining volumes, now figure in the 'Atlas' without any commentary. Santarém himself had reported in 1855 that Volume IV was 'all written and ready for the printer'. After his death in early 1856, the Secretary of the Real Academia de Ciências was in 1857 entrusted with the task of seeing Vol. IV through the press and preparing the manuscripts of the remaining volumes for publication, but 'although the man was well-paid during three years for the work expected from him, nothing was published and, still worse, Santarém's original text went astray and could never be found again'.

Santarém's best and most detailed biographer is undoubtedly Jordão A. de Freitas whose book, however, is written in Portuguese and therefore rather difficult to access. The same disadvantage applies to the chapter devoted to Santarém by Armando Cortesão in his work on Portuguese cartographers and cartography. In the latter's 'History of Portuguese Cartography written in English, however, an excellent account is given of Santarem's life and work. The short biographical note given here is largely based on this text.

In 1985 a facsimile edition of the third and last edition (1849) of his 'Atlas' was published by Rudolf Muller, bookseller and publisher in Amsterdam.

There is now, available in English, a biographical and bibliographical text about Visconde de Santarém in Dicionário de Historiadores Portugueses (Dictionary of Portuguese Historians), written by Daniel Estudante Protásio, a Portuguese researcher who has studied the life and works of Santarém since 1994. Other texts written by Protásio in Portuguese can also be downloaded at his personal page at Academia.edu.
