= Aguilar de Campos =

Coordinates: 41°59′N 5°11′W

Aguilar de Campos, Spain
- Flag Coat of arms

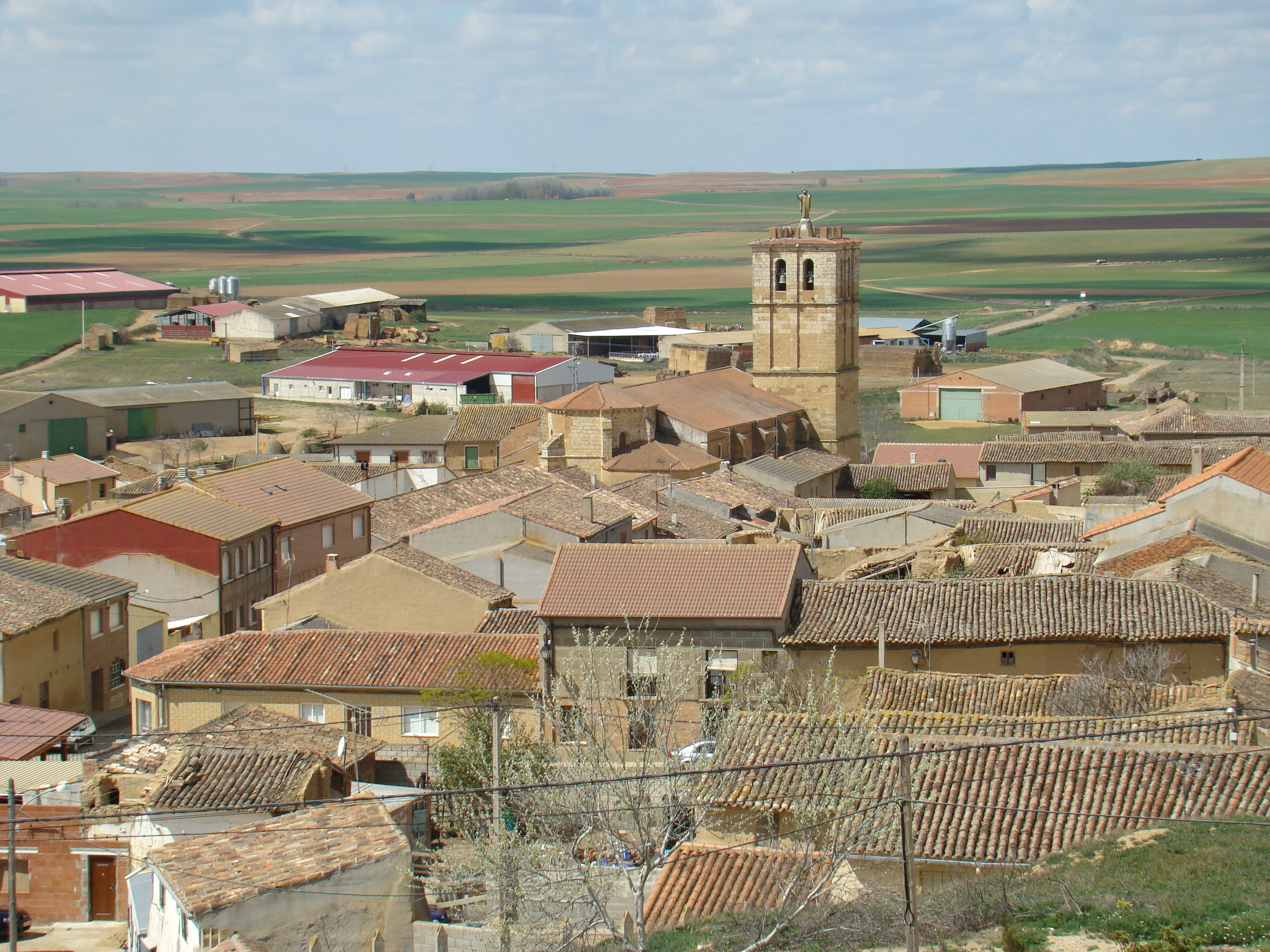
- panoramic view
- Country: Spain
- Autonomous community: Castile and León
- Province: Valladolid
- Municipality: Aguilar de Campos

Area
  - Total: 49.7 km^{2} (19.2 sq mi)

Population (2025-01-01)
  - Total: 258
  - Density: 5.19/km^{2} (13.4/sq mi)
- Time zone: UTC+1 (CET)
  - Summer (DST): UTC+2 (CEST)

Aguilar de Campos is a municipality located in the province of Valladolid, Castile and León, Spain. According to the 2004 census (INE), the municipality has a population of 337 inhabitants.

== Geography ==
It is located on the local road VP-5506, 5.5 km from the national road N-601, and 20 km from Medina de Rioseco, between Valladolid and León, in the historical region of Tierra de Campos.

It is an agricultural and livestock farming town. Its municipal area covers 49.7 square kilometers. In 1981 it had a population of 499 inhabitants. According to the INE, in 2008 the number of inhabitants had dropped to 306 and in 2018, to 244.

The municipality is crossed by the Navajos River, also known as Bustillo or Ahogaborricos stream, a tributary of the Valderaduey.

== Notable people ==
- Belarmino Tomás (1892–1950), socialist politician
