= Historical Atlas of China (1980) =

- Editors: Cheng Kuang-Yu (程光裕), Hsu Sheng-Mo (徐聖謨)
- Language: Chinese
- Genre: Atlas, History
- Publisher: Chinese Culture University Press
- Publication date: 1980 and 1983
- Publication place: Republic of China
- Media type: Print
- OCLC: 813481580

Historical Atlas of China (Chinese: 中國歷史地圖; pinyin: Zhōngguó lìshǐ dìtú) is a 2-volume work published in Taiwan in 1980 and 1983. The volumes are:

1. Historical territories.
2. Major cities, economic maps, irrigation and transportation networks, social changes, artifacts, wars.

Unlike many other historical maps that placed emphasis on placenames, this set of maps contained many restorations of historical sites.
