= Atlante Internazionale del Touring Club Italiano =

Italian reference atlas

The Atlante Internazionale del Touring Club Italiano was a comprehensive world reference atlas first published by the Touring Club Italiano in 1927.

In order to give Italy an extensive reference atlas modelled on foreign examples such as Stielers Handatlas in Germany, shortly after World War I preparatory work to this end began under the direction of Luigi Vittorio Bertarelli (founder of the TCI, 1859–1926) with collaboration of Olinto Marinelli as scientific editor and Pietro Corbellini as chief cartographer. The atlas, in which toponymy was based on the official language of each country, was presented to the public in 1927 as Atlante Internazionale del Touring Club Italiano; it had 169 leaves of maps, large folio format, and contained more than 200,000 entries. The second edition appeared already one year later and received the highest recognitions at the International Geographical Congress in Cambridge. Three more editions were issued up to World War II.

After the war the atlas maintained the same character with relief in the style of the great classic atlases (hachuring), in contrast to newly published works, that used isohypses (contour lines) to indicate altitudes. This, side by side with the superior typography of the hand-drawn type in the Atlante Internazionale, the lettering, gave the maps a very attractive appearance. The seventh edition was issued 1955/56, the last and eighth edition in 1968: an atlas of 50 x 32 centimetres with 94 tables, in total 173 pages of cartographic material, and an index, covering 250,000 geographical names; the map surface consisted of about 18 square metres! The eighth edition was finally reprinted in 1977.
