= Aguilar (1801 ship) =

British merchant saiing ship

History

United Kingdom
- Name: Aguilar
- Builder: William Watson, Stockwith, Gainsborough
- Launched: 30 May 1801
- Fate: Condemned 1825

General characteristics
- Tons burthen: 424, or 42438/94, or 435 (Note: Aguilar was lengthened in 1815, which increased her burthen.) (bm)
- Armament: 4 × 6-pounder guns + 2 × 18-pounder guns "of the New Construction"

Aguilar was launched in 1801, at Stockwith. She spent almost all of her career as a West Indiaman. In 1823, she made one voyage to Van Diemen's Land. On her return voyage she suffered storm damage and was condemned in 1825, at the Cape of Good Hope (CGH, or the Cape). Her loss gave rise to a court case that revealed interesting information about her last voyage.

== Career ==
Aguilar entered Lloyd's Register (LR) in 1801, with H.Ashingen, master, J.Braddick & Co., owners, and trade London–Jamaica.

Year	Master	Owner	Trade	Source & notes
1805	Robertson	J.Braddick	London–Jamaica	LR
1810	Robertson	J.Braddick	London–Jamaica	LR
1815	Robertson	J.Braddick	London–Jamaica	LR; thorough repair 1815
1820	Robinson	J.Braddick	London–Jamaica	LR; lengthened & thorough repair 1815
1825	J.Watson	R.Mount	London–Van Diemen's Land	LR; lengthened & thorough repair 1815

On 18 August 1823, Captain Watson sailed from Gravesend to Plymouth where he collected more passengers before departing England on 3 September 1823, for Van Diemen's Land, with her next destination being Tenerife. She arrived at the Cape on 22 December, and left on the 24th. She then reached Port Dalrymple (George Town, Tasmania).

Watson and Aguilar spent several months at George Town. Watson blamed the delay on the dangers of the Tamar River. This excuse angered Colonel George Arthur, fourth Lieutenant governor of Van Diemen's Land. Arthur resented the defaming of the port, blaming the delay not on the river but on Watson's having sent his mate and some seamen in a boat to hunt seals while waiting to gather a cargo.

On 4 August 1824, Aguilar and Watson were at Sydney, having come from Van Diemen's Land. On 24 February 1825, she was reported at the Sunda Strait, on her way to Singapore, where she arrived prior to 16 May. On 20 May, she sailed from Penang for London. On 19 October 1825, Aguilar arrived at Mauritius from Penang. On 9 November, she sailed for London.

== Fate ==
On 19 December, Aguilar put into Cape Town leaking badly. She was coming from Sincapore, Penang, and Mauritius, bound for London when a gale at Algoa Bay on 11 and 12 December, damaged her badly. First reports were that she would be repaired, but she was condemned and sold for breaking up.

== Postscript ==
In a court case concerning insurance on the cargo on Aguilar from Singapore to London the insurers attempted to refuse to pay the insured, charging delay and deviation. The case revealed the following detailed information about Aguilar's voyage.

She had arrived at the Cape on 3 December 1823, and left on 24 December. She arrived at Hobart Town on 4 February 1824, where she landed part of her cargo and three passengers. She left Hobart Town on 27 March, and arrived at George Town on 6 April, where she landed other passengers and cargo.

While at George Town, Watson was frequently on shore supervising the building of a house on some land he owned. He also purchased a schooner that he manned and equipped from Aguilar. The schooner made two seal hunting voyages and had not returned from the second before Aguilar sailed from Sydney; consequently Aguilar was not fully manned when she left for Singapore.

Aguilar sailed from George Town on 29 July, and arrived at Sydney on 5 August. There she landed passengers and the remainder of her outward bound cargo. She sailed from Sydney on 18 August, bound for Singapore, but bad weather sent her back down to Hobart Town. She did not arrive at Sincapore until 30 March 1823, when the insurance policy took effect. She left Sincapore on 25 May, for London.

The court found for the insurer.
