= Atlas Mira =

Soviet and Russian atlas

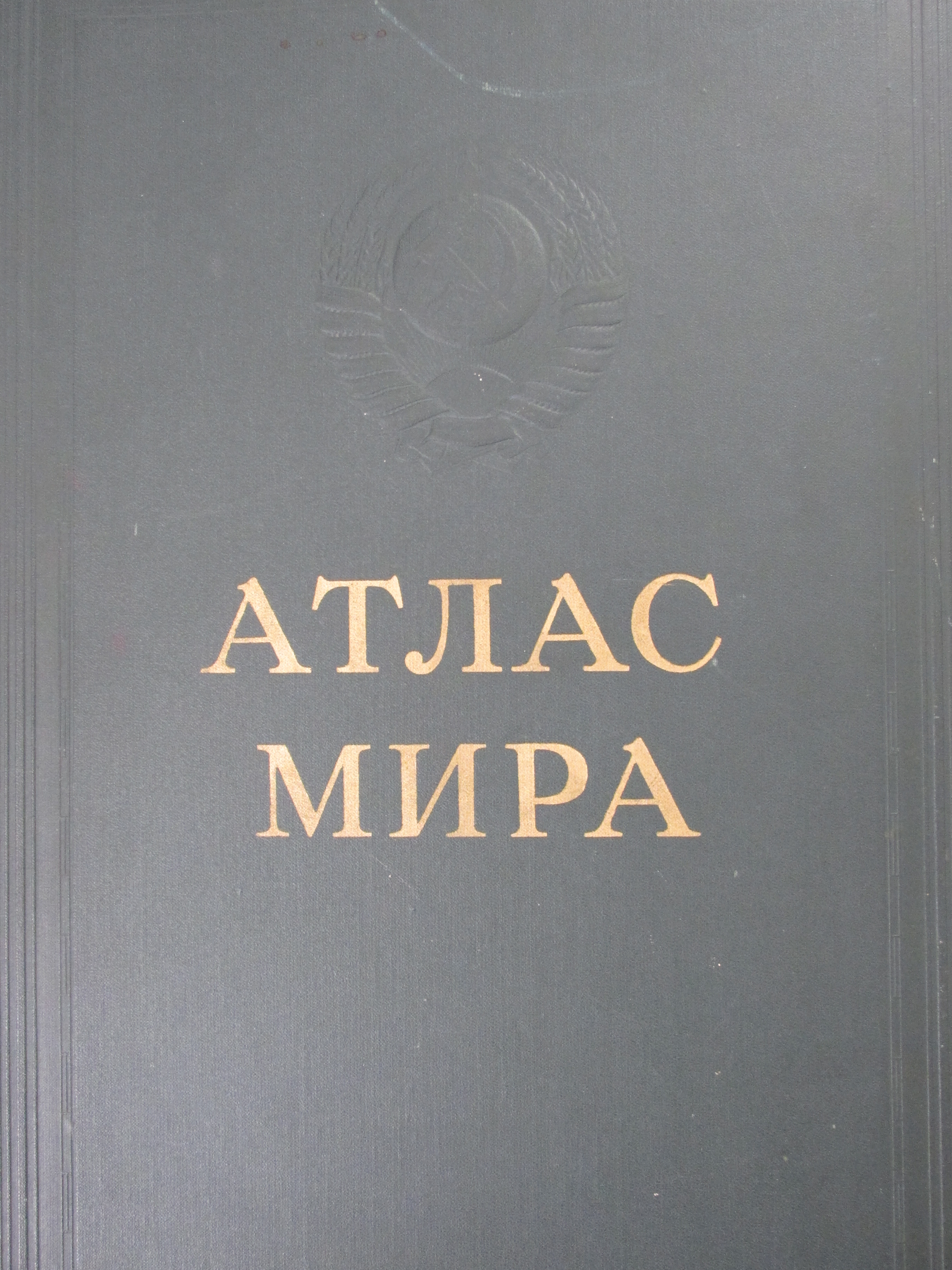
The Russian cover of the second 1967 edition

The World Atlas (Russian: Атлас мира, romanized: Atlas mira, lit. 'Atlas of the World') is the Soviet and later Russian created and produced atlas of the world.

== Predecessors ==
Initially Russian cartography simply reproduced maps from other countries. An example of such the Atlas Marksa, produced in 1905, was merely a translation of the German Neuer Handatlas by Lucas Debes. During the interwar period, the Soviet project Bolshoi Sovietskii Atlas Mira, was produced. This was intended to be the most comprehensive atlas of modern times, remained, however, incomplete due to The Second World War; only two out of three planned volumes were published in 1937 and 1939. With the end of the war, along with the relative stability within the Soviet Union during the 1950s, The Atlas Mira (1st Russian edition, 1954) was able to be produced and included with some 200,000 named locations. This would be a significant milestone and would be followed by an English edition a decade later (The World Atlas, 2nd ed., 1967).

== Editions ==
=== First Edition ===
The first edition was published in 1954, in two volumes. The first volume contains 283 pages of maps; the second volume is a geographical index containing 205,000 entries of geographical features.

On the first page of the atlas is a vignette with a world map inside a five-pointed star, prominently depicting the Soviet Union. Thereafter is the title page, on the reverse side the decision of the Council of Ministers of the USSR to publish the atlas, a page with the names of the editorial board, a page with the other editors, a preface of two pages and the table of contents in two pages.

Within the section containing maps, the first two pages contain a key to map symbols — also given as a separate sheet. Thereafter are the 283 pages with maps and finally a page with more names of collaborators, technical information and at the end the number of copies printed (25,000). Many maps are on a double page, with a total width of 63 cm. The reverse side of the left-hand page which comes first in leafing through atlas — the 'title side' — usually has a scheme with the current map and the adjacent sheets. A map is printed on the reverse side of almost all right-hand pages. Some maps are even wider than 63 cm and therefore have a foldout; see the table of contents.

The index, a separate volume, has a title page, a preface of two pages, a page on how to use the index, and a page with the abbreviations used. Thereafter is the actual index of 545 pages. In the end are 14 pages with translations of non-Russian geographical terms and words that occur in place names.

After the key to map symbols the map section has 5 pages of world maps, 3 pages with historical maps, 76 pages with maps of the Soviet Union in 53 pages with maps of Western Europe — meaning in this case the part of Europe that is outside the Soviet Union. The non-Soviet part of Asia — here also named 'foreign Asia' — covers 53 pages, Africa 18, The Americas 57 and Australia-Oceania 12. In the end are 6 pages with maps of the Atlantic Ocean, the Mediterranean Sea and the Polar regions. See also the list of map names in transliteration and translation.

Most sections start with a physical map — with contour lines and hypsometric coloring — a political map and a map of the communications in the region in question. The rest of each section consists of physical maps at a larger scale; see the list of maps, inset maps and scale. On the reverse sides of many right-hand pages are enlargements of regions on the 'main map'. Contrary to the main maps, on these maps the relief is often indicated with shading, which gives a more spatial effect. In the section on the Soviet Union each Union Republic has a map of its administrative subdivisions in political coloring. A political map is sometimes also given for other regions. On some maps the forests are indicated; details can be found in the list of types of maps.

The size of the atlas is considerable and so is the number of maps. Many regions are therefore depicted in detail, often at a scale of 1:5,000,000, 1:2,500,000 or 1:1,250,000. This has been done in particular for the Soviet Union itself and the 'friendly' states in the world — Eastern Europe, China — but also for Western Europe and the United States. These detailed maps are missing for Yugoslavia and the Netherlands. The environs of metropoles are sometimes given in (inset) maps at a scale of 1:250,000. Curiously, for the Soviet Union, Eastern Europe and China, these city maps are absent.

In the preface (see also the English translation), account is given of the composition of the atlas. There is also an overview and account of the map projections used in the atlas.

=== Second Edition ===
The second edition was published in Moscow in 1967 by the Chief Directorate of Geodesy and Cartography under the Council of Ministers of the USSR (GUGK; Russian: Главное управление геодезии и картографии (ГУГК) при Совете министров СССР).

It was published simultaneously in Russian and English in 25,000 copies and was priced at 42 Rbls. Special cartographic paper and special cartographic offset ink were used. The Atlas was dedicated to the 50th anniversary of the October Revolution. The Atlas has a full 250 pages of colour maps, majority of them physical, the index being a separate book, comprising some 200,000 entries. The size of the Atlas is 55 by 32 centimetres (22 in × 13 in).

The maps in the Atlas are arranged in groups starting with general world maps, maps of the Soviet Union and maps of the continents. The world maps are in the 1:50,000,000 scale. The Soviet Union is treated basically as a separate continent with its own physical, political, transportation and time zone maps. It is mentioned in the preface that the number of the maps of the Soviet Union is decreased compared to the previous edition, because of the interim publishing of a separate atlas specifically dedicated to the Soviet Union. For each continent, there is a general physical map as an introduction (1:10,000,000 to 1:25,000,000), followed by political and communications maps. This is followed by a number of general regional maps (1:1,500,000 to 1:750,000) and supplemented for important areas by large scale maps (1:250,000 to 1:750,000). 18 different colours are used from deep blue for the ocean deeps to dark brown and white for the highest mountains and glaciers. Relief shading is used for delineating relief along with contour lines. All scales are metric. Tint for elevation is predominately used in larger scale maps: 1:1,500,000 and higher. The shadows and colours combined give an almost stereo impression, the relief popping up out of the pages. Many major cities in the world are shown on separate maps or insets, typically in 1:250,000 scale as well as important areas like the Panama Canal or Palestine, along with detailed maps of small islands in the world oceans.

=== Third edition ===
The third edition was made in 1999 by the Federal Service of Geodesy and Cartography of Russia. As a revised and updated world atlas since it first published in 1954, this atlas which combined maps and index into one volume.

This atlas in third edition features detailed terrain models and color schemes and offers quality maps to each featured landscape this atlas features the main atlas, and an easy-to-reference index of all 240,000 place names. All maps feature a full double-page spread, with continents broken down into 286 pages of selected maps.

== See also ==
- World Map 1:2,500,000
- International Map of the World
