= Pergamon World Atlas =

1968 English-language world atlas

The Pergamon World Atlas is an English-language world atlas published in 1968 by Pergamon Press. The atlas is based on maps prepared by the Polish Army Topographical Service and published in 1962 as the Atlas Świata (World Atlas).

The atlas contains 380 pages of maps, figures and tables along with an index of 150,000 entries. Each geographic map is accompanied by a selection of thematic maps and city maps. The Pergamon added extra maps of the United Kingdom and Canada.
