= Atlas =

Collection of maps

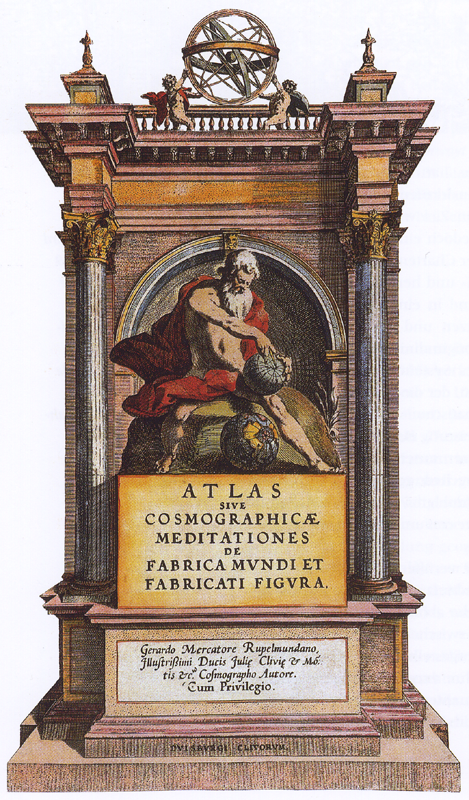
Frontispiece of the 1595 Atlas of Mercator

An atlas is a collection of maps; it is typically a bundle of maps of Earth or of a continent or region of Earth. Advances in astronomy have also resulted in atlases of the celestial sphere or of other planets.

Atlases have traditionally been bound into book form, but today, many atlases are in multimedia formats. In addition to presenting geographical features and political boundaries, many atlases often feature geopolitical, social, religious, and economic statistics. They also have information about the map and places in it.

== Etymology ==
The use of the word "atlas" in a geographical context dates from 1595 when the Flemish geographer Gerardus Mercator published Atlas Sive Cosmographicae Meditationes de Fabrica Mundi et Fabricati Figura ("Atlas or cosmographical meditations upon the creation of the universe and the universe as created"). This title provides Mercator's definition of the word as a description of the creation and form of the whole universe, not simply as a collection of maps. The volume that was published posthumously one year after his death is a wide-ranging text but, as the editions evolved, it became simply a collection of maps and it is in that sense that the word was used from the middle of the 17th century. The neologism coined by Mercator was a mark of his respect for the Titan Atlas, the "King of Mauretania", whom he considered to be the first great geographer.

== History ==
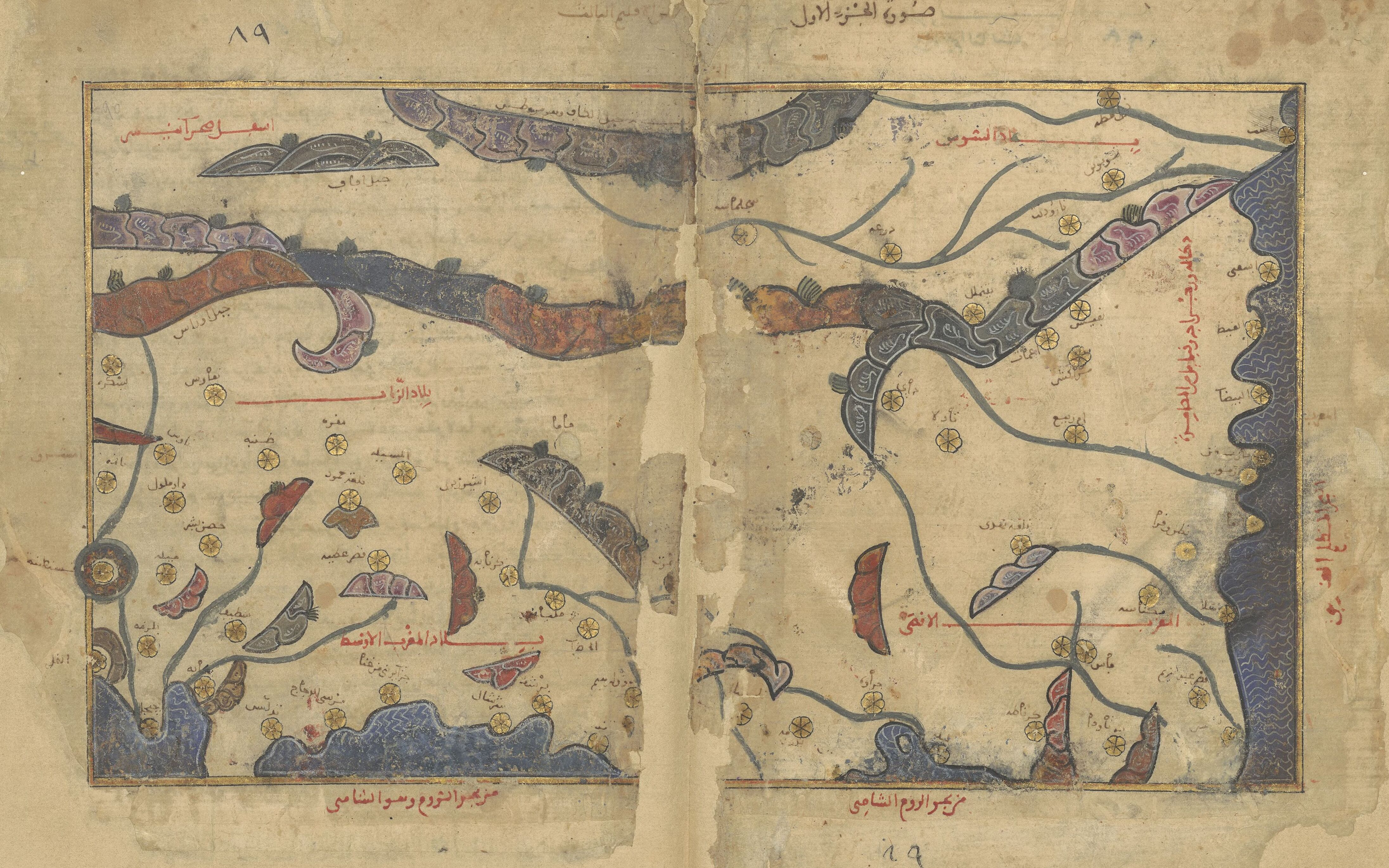
The Maghreb (south-up) in Muhammad al-Idrisi's Nuzhat al-Mushtāq (نزهة المشتاق في اختراق الآفاق), also known as the Tabula Rogeriana (12th century).

World map Theatrum Orbis Terrarum (Theatre of the Orb of the World) by Abraham Ortelius, 1570

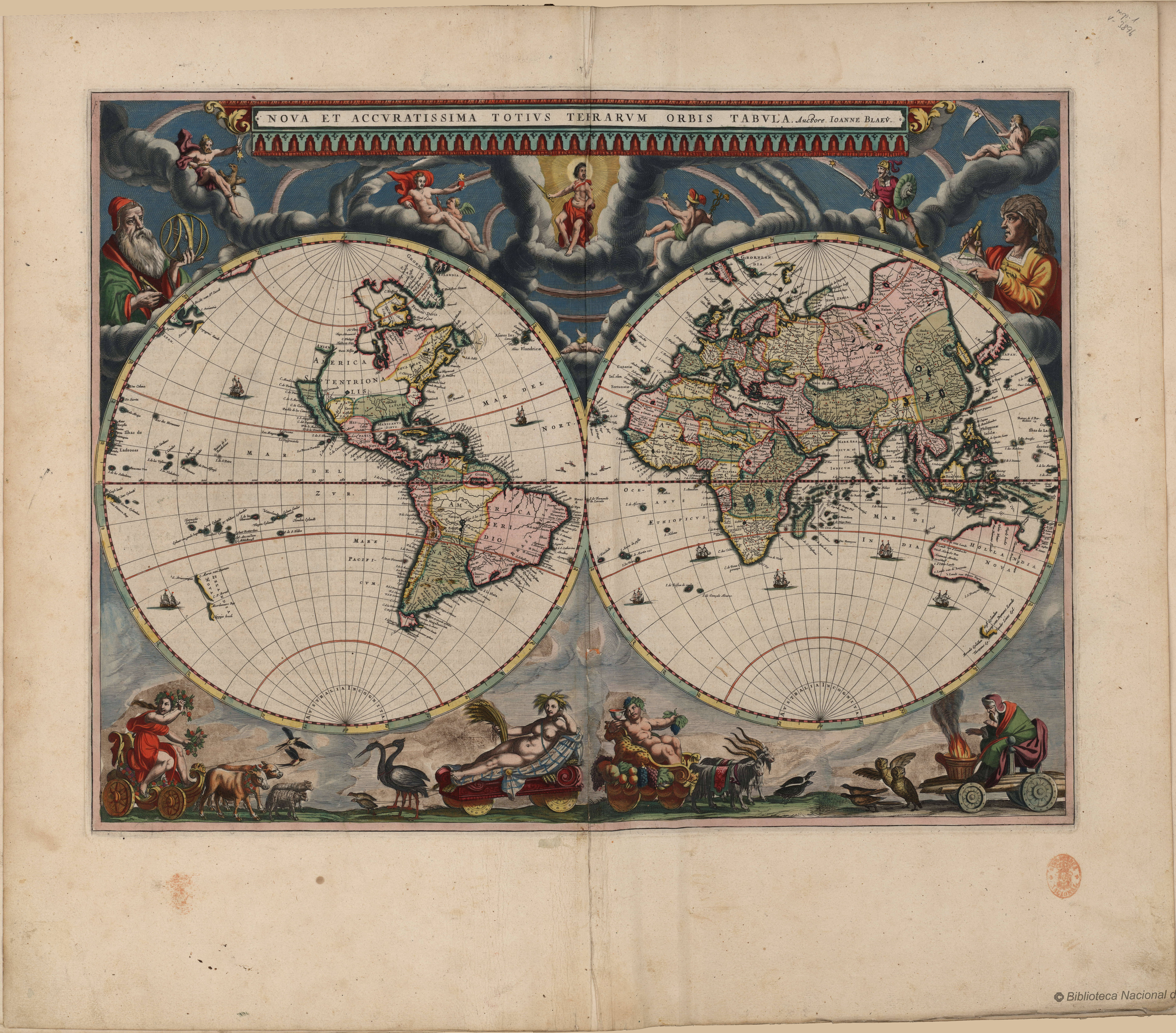
Joan Blaeu's world map, originally prepared by Blaeu for his Atlas Maior, published in the first book of the Atlas van Loon (1664).

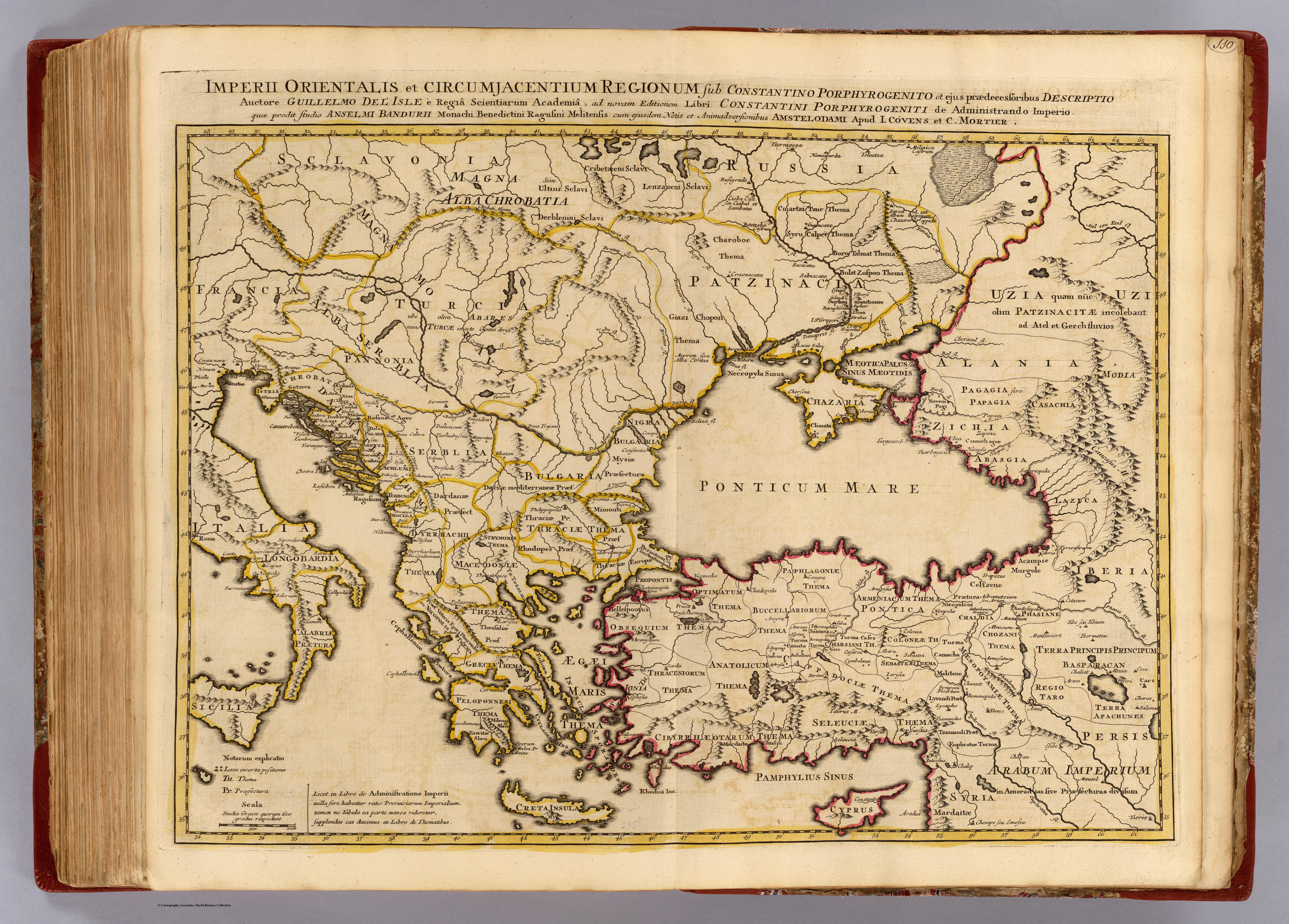
Imperii Orientalis et Circumjacentium Regionum by Guillaume Delisle (1742)

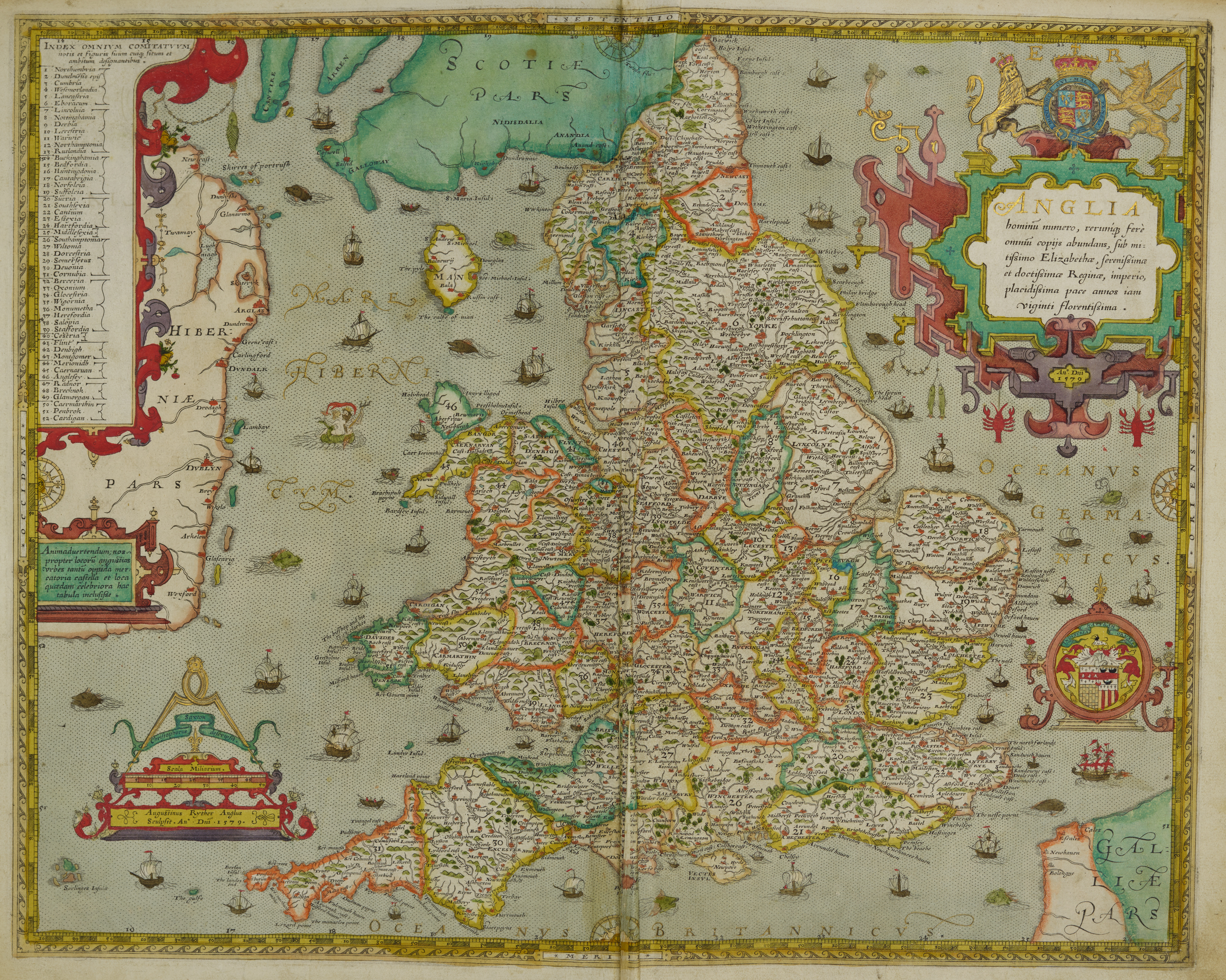
Map of England and Wales by Christopher Saxton, Atlas of the Counties of England and Wales, 1579

The first work that contained systematically arranged maps of uniform size representing the first modern atlas was prepared by Italian cartographer Pietro Coppo in the early 16th century; however, it was not published at that time, so it is conventionally not considered the first atlas. Rather, that title is awarded to the collection of maps Theatrum Orbis Terrarum by the Brabantian cartographer Abraham Ortelius printed in 1570.

Atlases published nowadays are quite different from those published in the 16th–19th centuries. Unlike today, most atlases were not bound and ready for the customer to buy, but their possible components were shelved separately. The client could select the contents to their liking, and have the maps coloured/gilded or not. The atlas was then bound. Thus, early printed atlases with the same title page can be different in contents.

States began producing national atlases in the 19th century.

== Types ==
A travel atlas is made for easy use during travel, and often has spiral bindings, so it may be folded flat. National atlases in Europe are typically printed at a scale of 1:250,000 to 1:500,000; (Note: about 4 miles to the inch to about 7 1/2 miles/inch) city atlases are 1:20,000 to 1:25,000, (Note: about 3 inches/mile to 2 1/2 inches/mile) doubling for the central area (for example, Geographers' A–Z Map Company's A–Z atlas of London is 1:22,000 for Greater London and 1:11,000 for Central London). (Note: About 4 inches/mile and 8 inches/mile.) A travel atlas may also be referred to as a road map.

A desk atlas is made similar to a reference book. It may be in hardback or paperback form.

Star atlases depict the celestial sphere in cartographic format, focusing on the major named asterisms. There are atlases of the other planets (and their satellites) in the Solar System.

Atlases of anatomy exist, mapping out organs of the human body or other organisms.

== Selected atlases ==
Some cartographically or commercially important atlases are:

=== 17th century and earlier ===
- Theatrum Orbis Terrarum 1570 atlas by Abraham Ortelius
- Atlas Sive Cosmographicae Meditationes de Fabrica Mundi et Fabricati Figura (Mercator, Duisburg, in present-day Germany, 1595)
- Atlas Novus (Joan Blaeu, Netherlands, 1635–1658)
- Atlas Maior (Blaeu, Netherlands, 1662–1667)
- Cartes générales de toutes les parties du monde (France, 1658–1676)
- Dell'Arcano del Mare (Robert Dudley, England/Italy, 1645–1661)
- Piri Reis map (Piri Reis, Ottoman Empire, 1570–1612)
- Theatrum Orbis Terrarum (Ortelius, Netherlands, 1570–1612)
- Klencke Atlas (1660; one of the world's largest books)
- Britannia (1675), John Ogilby (1600–1676), first to be printed at a specific scale (1:63,360 or one inch to one mile)

=== 18th century ===
- Atlas Nouveau (Amsterdam, 1742)
- Britannia Depicta (London, 1720)
- Cary's New and Correct English Atlas (London, 1787)

=== 19th century ===
- Andrees Allgemeiner Handatlas (Germany, 1881–1939; in the UK as Times Atlas of the World, 1895)
- Rand McNally Atlas (United States, 1881–present)
- Stielers Handatlas (Germany, 1817–1944)
- Times Atlas of the World (United Kingdom, 1895–present)

=== 20th century ===
- Atlante Internazionale del Touring Club Italiano (Italy, 1927–1978)
- Atlas Linguisticus (Austria, 1934)
- Atlas Mira (Soviet Union/Russia, 1937–present)
- Geographers' A–Z Street Atlas (United Kingdom, 1938–present)
- Gran Atlas Aguilar (Spain, 1969/1970)
- The Historical Atlas of China (China)
- National Geographic Atlas of the World (United States, 1963–present)
- Pergamon World Atlas (1962/1968)
- DK Atlas of World History (1999)

=== 21st century ===
- North American Environmental Atlas

== See also ==
- Atlas of Our Changing Environment
- Bird atlas – Ornithological data in map form
- Cartography – Study and practice of making maps
- Cartopedia – Atlas computer program
- Cloud atlas – Compendium of cloud types
- European Atlas of the Seas – Web-based atlas
- Fictitious entry – Deliberately incorrect entry in a reference work
- Geography – Study of Earth's spatial information
- Google Maps – Web mapping service
- Manifold – Topological space that locally resembles Euclidean space
- NASA World Wind – Open-source virtual globe
- National Atlas of the United States – Atlas published by the United States Department of the Interior from 1874-1997
- Star atlas – Part of astronomy concerned with mapping of stars
- TerraServer-USA – Online repository of US aerial imagery
