= DK Atlas of World History =

Book of maps published in 1999

- DK Atlas of World History, first edition, 1999.
- Author: Jeremy Black (Editor)
- Language: English
- Subject: World history
- Genre: Historical atlases
- Published: London
- Publisher: Dorling Kindersley
- Publication date: 1999 (2nd 2005)
- ISBN: 9780751307191
- OCLC: 43091166

The DK Atlas of World History is a historical atlas first published in 1999 by Dorling Kindersley. A second edition, titled the DK World History Atlas, was published in 2005. Both were produced under the general editorship of Jeremy Black, with the slogan "Mapping the human journey".

The atlas covers a period of 20,000 years, from the emergence of the first human beings to the modern age, and is divided into two main sections: "Eras of World History" and "Regional History", each of which is further divided into a number of double-page spreads on individual subjects, featuring one or more maps with accompanying text, timelines, and illustrations in the Dorling Kindersley house style.

The atlas was welcomed by reviewers for adopting a more global approach that increased the coverage of non-European history.

== Background ==
In his 1992 article on the history of historical atlases, Black discussed the Eurocentrism of past efforts, the balance between text, images, and maps, the desirable level of detail, and the practical difficulties in compiling such atlases, which were time-consuming and expensive to produce, particularly if maps had to be created from scratch using primary sources and the atlas had a large number of maps.

He also considered the use of colour, which he found principally to be used for extra visual impact, with the possible disadvantage that sharply defined national borders of differing colours sometimes suggested more uniformity of political power than existed in reality. He concluded by calling on the compilers of historical atlases to rise to the challenge of depicting race, gender, and other cross-national themes that they had sometimes rejected as too difficult.

== Publication history ==
The DK Atlas of World History was first published in London in 1999 by Dorling Kindersley, and translated into German, Italian, Norwegian, Icelandic, and Japanese, among other languages. A second edition, titled the DK World History Atlas, was published in 2005 and a compact edition in 2008. All these editions were under the general editorship of Black.

== Content ==
The atlas covers a span of 20,000 years from the emergence of the first human beings to the modern age. The first edition included 470 maps, 420 timelines, a subject index and glossary, gazetteer, and bibliography. It did not include a general introduction. The book is divided into two main sections: "Eras of World History" and "Regional History", each of which is further divided into a number of double-page spreads on particular subjects, featuring one or more maps with accompanying text, timelines, and illustrations. A number of historic maps are reproduced.

== Reviews ==
In a review of a new edition of the Oxford Atlas of World History, which aimed to offer a more global and less North American and European perspective, Kimberly C. Kowal felt that the Oxford atlas was less successful in this objective than both the DK Atlas of World History and The Complete Atlas of World History.

In her guide to geographical sources, Jenny Marie Johnson noted that the book follows a familiar Dorling Kindersley style of combining colourful graphs, maps, and illustrations, and that it tries to balance regional and global material.

In their survey of historical atlases in International Labor and Working-Class History, Michael Hanagan and Peter Nekola, who measured everything against the gold standard atlases of Geoffrey Barraclough, found the DK Atlas to be better than they expected, and appreciated the worldwide and continental-scale maps that enabled a better understanding of subjects such as the spread of agriculture, the slave trade, and the movement of indentured labour. Hanagan and Nekola also noted that only around 14% of the maps dealt with European themes, which they contrasted with older and pre-Barraclough atlases, which had over 50% European maps. They felt, however, that Black placed too much emphasis on the role of state formation in historical geography.
