= Gran Atlas Aguilar =

Spanish atlas

The Atlas Universal Aguilar was the first comprehensive world atlas of Spanish origin appeared in the 1950s. Published by Aguilar S.A. de Ediciones in Madrid in 1954 with 116 pages of maps preceded by an atlas of Spain. Five further editions were published until 1968, then this notable work was excelled by the three volume, large-sized Gran Atlas Aguilar by the same company (1969/1970, 406 pages of geographic and thematic maps), one of the most elaborate works of its kind published after World War II. A concise edition was issued as Atlas Mundial Gráfico Aguilar (1976), also published in 1982 by The Kimberley Press, Miami, Florida as Webster's New World Atlas.
