= Yang Shoujing =

Chinese diplomat, geographer and historian (1839–1915)

- 楊守敬
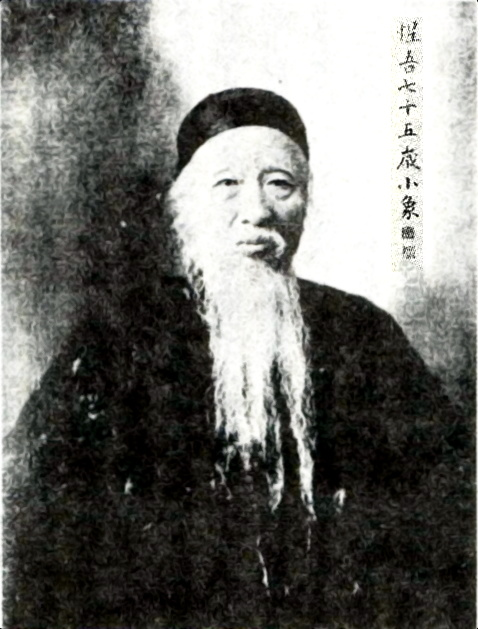
- Yang Shoujing at age 75
- Born: June 2, 1839; Lucheng Town, Yidu, Hubei, Qing China
- Died: January 9, 1915 (aged 75); Beijing, Republic of China
- Occupations: Antiquarian, bibliophile, calligrapher, diplomat, geographer, and historian

Chinese name
- Traditional Chinese: 楊守敬
- Simplified Chinese: 杨守敬
Transcriptions
Standard Mandarin
- Hanyu Pinyin: Yáng Shǒujìng
- Wade–Giles: Yang Shou-ching

Yang Kaike
- Traditional Chinese: 楊開科
- Simplified Chinese: 杨开科
Transcriptions
Standard Mandarin
- Hanyu Pinyin: Yáng Kāikē

Yang Kai
- Traditional Chinese: 楊凱
- Simplified Chinese: 杨凯
Transcriptions
Standard Mandarin
- Hanyu Pinyin: Yáng Kǎi

Xingwu
- Chinese: 惺吾
Transcriptions
Standard Mandarin
- Hanyu Pinyin: Xīngwú

Lingsu Laoren
- Traditional Chinese: 鄰蘇老人
- Simplified Chinese: 邻苏老人
Transcriptions
Standard Mandarin
- Hanyu Pinyin: Línsū Lǎorén

Yang Shoujing (Chinese: 楊守敬; pinyin: Yáng Shǒujìng; Wade–Giles: Yang Shou-ching; 1839 – 9 January 1915) was a Chinese antiquarian, bibliophile, calligrapher, diplomat, geographer, and historian. He is best known for the historical atlas Lidai yudi tu, commonly called the Yangtu ("Yang's atlas"), the most complete and scholarly historical atlas of China produced during the Qing dynasty. He devoted most of his life to the annotation of the 6th-century geographic work Shui jing zhu, which was completed by his disciple Xiong Huizhen and published as the Shui jing zhu shu.

As a Qing diplomat posted in Japan, Yang purchased tens of thousands of ancient Chinese books from Japanese libraries and archives, many of which had become rare or lost in China. After his death, the government of the Republic of China purchased his collection and preserved most of the books in the National Palace Museum.

Yang was an accomplished calligrapher of the Stele School and became highly influential in Japan. The introduction of his art was said to have "offered virtually an unprecedented aesthetic style" to Japan and "revolutionized" Japanese calligraphy. Yang's former residence and tomb in Yidu, Hubei are now protected as a Major National Historical and Cultural Site of China.

== Biography ==
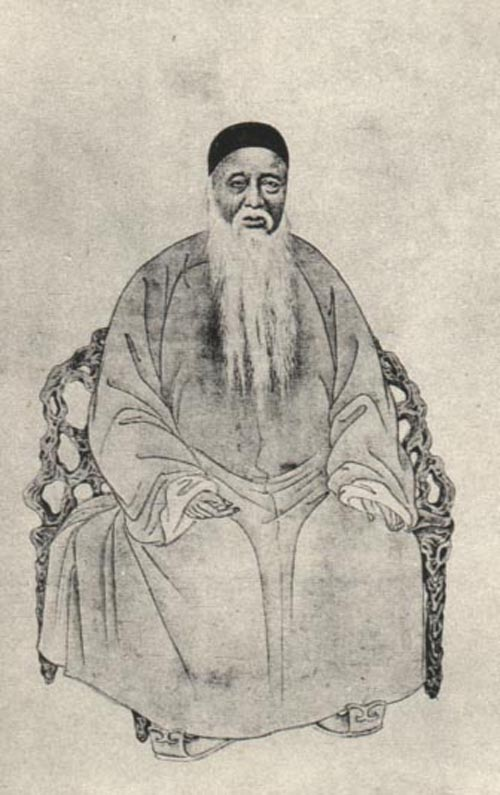
Yang Shoujing's portrait in Illustrated Biographies of Qing Dynasty Scholars (清代學者象傳, 1928)

Yang was born in 1839, during the Qing dynasty, in Lucheng Town, Yidu County, Hubei Province. His courtesy name was Xingwu (惺吾). After passing the provincial examination and earning the juren degree in 1862 (first year of the Tongzhi reign), he lived for ten years in Beijing trying to pass the imperial examination for the highest jinshi degree, without success. Although he failed the examinations, he became friends with the prominent officials Pan Zuyin and Zhang Zhidong, who shared his passion for antiques. He attended Pan's lavish parties and shopped for antiques in Beijing's Liulichang with Zhang.

From a young age Yang was interested in geography, and spent much of his life annotating Li Daoyuan's 6th-century work Commentary on the Water Classic (Shui Jing Zhu). His knowledge in geography earned him a diplomatic post to Japan, despite his repeated examination failure. In Tokyo he worked under the career diplomat Li Shuchang, an abrasive superior who nevertheless appreciated Yang's knowledge in antiques. As Japan was quickly westernizing during the Meiji Restoration, traditional Chinese publications fell out of fashion and were sold cheaply. Working with Li as well as Japanese antiquarians, Yang purchased tens of thousands of old Chinese books preserved in Japanese collections, many of which had become rare or even lost in China. They were later published as Guyi congshu (古逸丛书). After Yang's death, the Republic of China government purchased his collection and preserved most of his books in the National Palace Museum.

Yang was posted in Japan from 1880 to 1884. After returning to China, he taught at the Lianghu Academy in Wuchang and then became dean of the Qincheng School (勤成学堂), later renamed as Cungu School (存古学堂). In 1909 he served as an advisory official of the Ministry of Rites. He died in Beijing on 9 January 1915, and was buried in his hometown Yidu.

== Annotation of the Commentary on the Water Classic ==
Yang devoted most of his lifetime to the annotation of the Commentary on the Water Classic (Shui jing zhu). He wrote 40 volumes of annotation but died before completing the work. His disciple Xiong Huizhen carried on the project and wrote another 40 volumes of annotation. It was published in the 1950s as the Shui jing zhu shu (水經註疏). The influential historian Gu Jiegang remarked that the work "brought to a point of culmination the textual research of The Classic of Waterways of the previous three centuries." He greatly admired the authors' "single-minded devotion" to the task, and Xiong's devotion to his master.

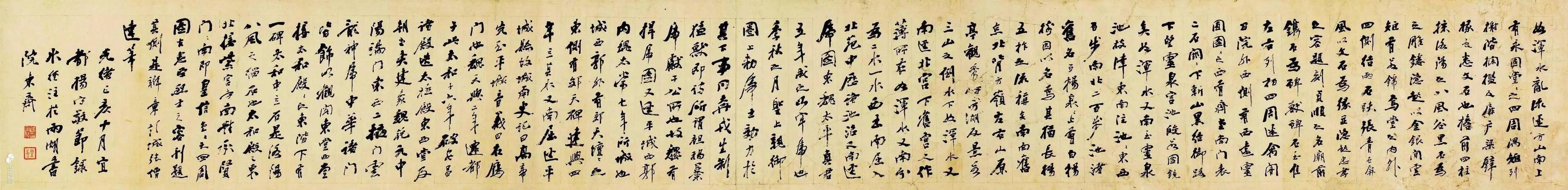
An excerpt from Li Daoyuan's Shui Jing Zhu, in Yang Shoujing's calligraphy (1899)

== Historical atlas of China ==
Another of Yang's important works is the Lidai yudi tu (歷代輿地圖), his historical atlas of China which is often simply called the Yangtu (Yang's atlas). Yang began the work in 1866 with the assistance of Deng Yongxiu, and was joined by Rao Dunzhi in the late 1870s. They plotted historical geographical data on a Qing dynasty map, but left out non-Han Chinese kingdoms such as Nanzhao and Dali. Published between 1906 and 1911, it was the most complete and scholarly historical atlas of China produced during the Qing dynasty. Based on Yang's atlas, historian Tan Qixiang compiled The Historical Atlas of China, which was published in the 1980s and is considered the most authoritative atlas of Chinese history ever published.

== Calligraphy ==
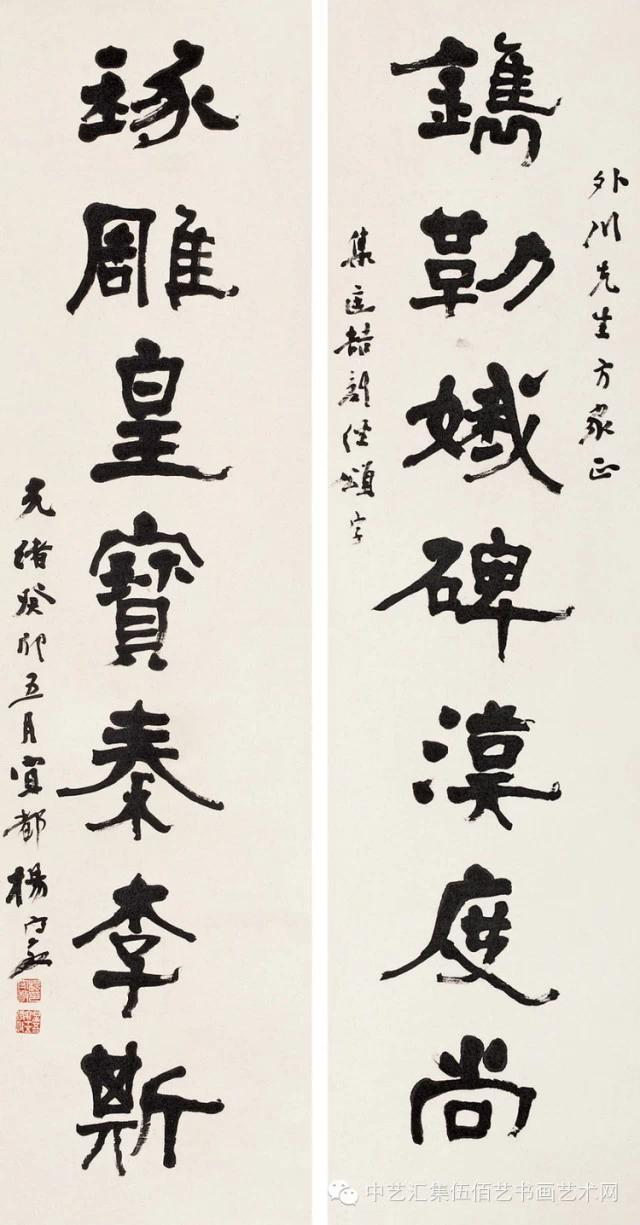
Yang Shoujing's calligraphy (1903)

With the encouragement of Pan Zuyin, Yang became an accomplished calligrapher of the Stele School of Chinese calligraphy. When he went to Japan, he introduced the style to Japanese calligraphers, offering them "virtually an unprecedented aesthetic style" and revolutionizing Japanese calligraphy. He was considered a talented artist by famous Japanese calligraphers such as Miyajima Seiichiro, Kusakabe Meikaku, Iwaya Osamu, and Matsuda Sekka. Iwaya Osamu and others bought hundreds of sheets of Yang's works. Yang wrote many essays on the Stele School of calligraphy, which were published by Japanese scholars in two volumes, Ping bei ji (評碑記, "Record of stelae criticism") and Ping tie ji (評帖記, "Record of model-letters criticism").

== Memorials ==
In September 1986, the government of Yidu city repaired Yang Shoujing's tomb and former residence, which was turned into the Yang Shoujing Museum. His residence and tomb are now protected as a Major National Historical and Cultural Site of China (designation 6–995).
