= Xiong Huizhen =

Chinese historical geographer

Xiong Huizhen (Chinese: 熊會貞; Wade–Giles: Hsiung Hui-chen; died 1936) was a Chinese historical geographer and a disciple of the late-Qing dynasty scholar Yang Shoujing. He is known for completing the Shui jing zhu shu, a monumental annotation of the 6th-century geographic classic Shui jing zhu.

== Biography ==
Xiong Huizhen was born in Zhijiang County, Hubei during the Qing dynasty, and studied under the prominent historical geographer and bibliophile Yang Shoujing, who was also a native of Hubei. Yang spent most of his life annotating the 6th-century geographic work Shui jing zhu. Having completed 40 volumes of annotation, he died in 1915 without completing the work. Xiong carried on the project and wrote another 40 volumes. He also made the final editing of the entire work, painstakingly proofreading the annotations word by word.

It took Xiong 22 years to complete the work, known as the Shui jing zhu shu. He refused offers made by Japanese scholars to purchase the book. However, when he learned that the descendants of Yang Shoujing had secretly sold some manuscripts, he committed suicide by hanging himself in 1936.

The Second Sino-Japanese War soon broke out in 1937. The Chinese government paid great attention to the protection of the manuscript as well as Yang Shoujing's precious book collection. Scholar Fu Sinian negotiated on behalf of Academia Sinica and the Ministry of Education to purchase the manuscript from Yang's heir Yang Mianzhi for 3,000 dollars, and brought it to Hong Kong for safekeeping. It was eventually published in Taiwan the early 1950s, and in mainland China in 1957.

The influential historian Gu Jiegang commented that the Shui jing zhu shu "brought to a point of culmination the textual research of The Classic of Waterways of the previous three centuries." He greatly admired Yang Shoujing and Xiong Huizhen for their "single-minded devotion" to the task, and Xiong's devotion to his master.
