= Zhong Jingwen =

Chinese folklorist (1903–2002)

- 钟敬文
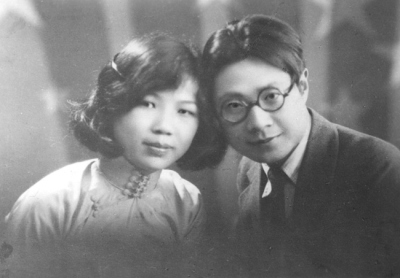
- Zhong Jingwen and his wife, 1933
- Born: Tan Zong; March 2, 1903; Haifeng County, Guangdong, China
- Died: January 10, 2002 (aged 98); Beijing, China

Academic work
- Era: 1920s–1980s
- Discipline: Folklorist
- Institutions: Sun Yat-sen University, Beijing Normal University

Zhong Jingwen
- Simplified Chinese: 钟敬文
- Traditional Chinese: 鍾敬文
Transcriptions
Standard Mandarin
- Hanyu Pinyin: Zhōng Jìngwén
- Wade–Giles: Chung1 Ching4-wen2
Yue: Cantonese
- Jyutping: zung1 ging3 man4

Tan Zong
- Simplified Chinese: 谭宗
- Traditional Chinese: 譚宗
Transcriptions
Standard Mandarin
- Hanyu Pinyin: Tán Zōng
- Wade–Giles: T'an2 Tsung1
Yue: Cantonese
- Jyutping: taam4 zung1

Zhong Jingwen (Chinese: 钟敬文, March 20, 1903 – January 10, 2002) was a Chinese folklorist. Sometimes called the "father of Chinese folklore studies", Zhong pioneered folklore studies from the 1920s to 1980s. Born in Eastern Guangdong in 1903, he attended Sun Yat-sen University and co-founded the Folklore Society of SYSU, the first folkloristics society in China, alongside prominent academics such as Gu Jiegang and Dong Zuobin. He briefly served as the chief editor of two folklore periodicals and published a monograph on folk arts. He was fired from the university in 1928, and later served as a visiting professor at Waseda University in Tokyo.

In 1949, he accepted a professorship at Beijing Normal University. The following year, he became the first vice-chairman of the Research Society of Chinese Literature and Arts alongside chairman Guo Moruo. After academia and folkloristics were disrupted by the Cultural Revolution, Zhong played a key role in the refoundation of folklore studies in China, serving as the first president of the China Folklore Society and the head of China's first folklore doctoral program during the early 1980s. He began work on a six-volume series entitled History of Chinese Folklore, which was completed and published by one of his students after his death.

== Early life and career ==
On March 20, 1903, Zhong Jingwen was born Tan Zong (谭宗) in Haifeng County, Guangdong. Zhong was a major contributor to Folksong Weekly (歌謠週刊; Gēyáo Zhōukān), an early folklore studies journal published at Peking University from 1922 to 1925. In 1926, he traveled to Guangzhou, where he began work and study at Lingnan University. He published his first book, a local folklore compilation entitled Folk Tales (民间趣事; Mínjiān qùshì), later the same year. In 1927, upon recommendation from Gu Jiegang, he became an assistant at Sun Yat-sen University (SYSU), also in Guangzhou.

In November 1927, Zhong co-founded a weekly folklore journal titled Folk Literature and Arts (民間文藝; Mínjiān wényì) alongside Dong Zuobin, Yang Chengzhi, and He Sijing. Zhong was the chief editor and a major contributor to the journal. Dong returned to Nanyang in December to care for his sick mother, leaving Zhong as the sole editor. After twelve issues, the journal's sponsors discontinued it in 1928, seeing it as overly focused on literature and art at the expense of broader folklore studies.

Later in November 1927, Zhong joined with other literature and history faculty (including Gu Jiegang, Dong Zuobin, and Rong Zhaozu) of SYSU to found the Folklore Society of SYSU, the first such folkloristics society in China. Inspired by the SYSU Society, folklore societies were founded at at least ten other Chinese universities. In 1928, the society published Zhong's monograph Collected Lectures on Folk Arts, a systemic analysis of a number of folk songs and stories collected among ethnic minority groups in China. A portion is dedicated to the Zhuang people of Guangxi, with a focus on the mythical singer Liu Sanjie; he describes the Zhuang as "savages" with "extremely naïve behaviors", attributing their fantastical folk songs to their irrationality, immaturity, and lack of civilization.

In March 1928, the Folklore Society began publication of a successor to Folk Literature and Arts titled Folklore Weekly (民俗周刊; Mínsú zhōukān). Zhong served as chief editor, supervised by Gu and Rong. The journal became the primary publication of the Society and the most voluminous periodical of the growing Folklore Movement, with 123 issues produced over its 1928–1933 publication run. Zhong's tenure as editor was short-lived; university president Dai Jitao fired Zhong in the summer of 1928 for publishing the Second Collection of Wu Songs, containing songs that Dai saw as glorifying superstition. At the invitation of Liu Dabai, he became a professor at the College of Arts and Sciences of Zhejiang University in Hangzhou.

During the 1920s, Zhong partnered with Zhao Jingshen to perform comparative studies of western and Chinese children's literature. In 1934, Zhong left his position at Zhejiang to serve as a visiting professor at Waseda University in Tokyo, Japan. While at Waseda, he worked alongside various Japanese sinologists and mythologist Shinji Nishimura. He returned to teaching in Hangzhou in 1936.

== Postwar career ==
In 1949, Zhong attended the First Congress of Literary and Art Workers in Beijing. Later that year, he accepted a professorship at Beijing Normal University by Li Jinxi. Concurrently, Zhong instructed at Peking University and Fu Jen Catholic University. The incipient Communist government established the Research Society of Chinese Literature and Arts in February 1950 to organize folklore studies under Marxist principles. Zhong served as its first vice-chairman from 1950 to 1957, with Guo Moruo as chairman. The following year, Zhong published an article titled "Some Basic Understandings About Folk Literature and Arts", emphasizing the importance of folk literature and oral history towards understanding the history of the working class. In 1953, he began lecturing on folk literature at Beijing Normal University and became a graduate instructor in folklore studies. Zhong's approach was opposed by hardliners of communist folkloristics such as Jia Zhi, who accused him of being a "salesman of capitalist folklore".

The Cultural Revolution put a halt to nearly all higher education in mainland China. Folklore studies in particular took a heavy blow, as it was regarded as a continuation of feudal culture. Coinciding with the return of folklore classes at universities in 1978, Zhong drafted a petition to the Chinese Academy of Social Sciences to re-establish folklore study and research institutions. The petition was joined by six other folklorists, including Gu, Yang, and Rong. This led to the foundation of the government-unrecognized China Folklore Society (Note: In contrast to the semi-official Chinese Folk Literature and Arts Association.) in May 1983, with Zhong as its first president. During the early 1980s, Zhong headed the folklore doctoral program at Beijing Normal University, which was the only such program in China for more than a decade. Zhong's centrality to the establishment of folklore studies in China has led to him being known as the "father of Chinese folklore studies".

Beginning in 1984, Zhong and Zhou Weizhi served as vice chief-editors of the Three Collections of Chinese Folk Literature project, headed by Zhou Yang. He continued instruction of doctoral students at Peking until his death, alongside work on his History of Chinese Folklore, which he began in 2000. He died in Beijing on January 10, 2002.
