= Elisabeth Gottschalk =

Dutch historical geographer (1912–1989)

- Elisabeth Gottschalk (1964)
- Born: Maria Karoline Elisabeth Gottschalk; 28 October 1912; Mönchengladbach, Kingdom of Prussia, Germany
- Died: 14 September 1989 (aged 76); Amsterdam, Netherlands
- Education: University of Utrecht
- Notable work: Stormvloeden en rivieroverstromingen in Nederland (1971–1977)

Maria Karoline Elisabeth Gottschalk (Note: Also Marie Karoline Elisabeth Gottschalk.) (28 October 1912 – 14 September 1989) was a German-born Dutch historical geographer and professor. She was noted for Stormvloeden en rivieroverstromingen in Nederland (Storm surges and river floods in the Netherlands), a three volume study into the historical storm surges and river floods, which is considered a standard work which corrected the existing theories behind storm surges.

== Biography ==
Gottschalk was born on 28 October 1912 in Mönchengladbach, Germany. She became a teacher in Margraten, Netherlands. In 1938, she changed to Dutch nationality. During World War II, she started to research the historical geography of Zeelandic Flanders, but lost her research papers during the war.

In 1949, Gottschalk started studying social geography at the University of Utrecht, and graduated in 1952. In 1955, she obtained her doctorate cum laude with Historische Geografie van Westelijk Zeeuws-Vlaanderen which was a poorly documented subject. In 1962, she became lector historical geography at the University of Amsterdam.

In 1971, Gottschalk published the first volume of Stormvloeden en rivieroverstromingen in Nederland in which she researched the storm surges and river floods before 1400, and corrected many errors in the existing history, and discovered surges which were based on legends instead of facts. She proved that many more factors played a role, and corrected the theories behind the development of the Zuiderzee and the Dollart. In 1977, the third and final volume was published which was described by the Leeuwarder Courant as the standard work on floods in the Netherlands.

Gottschalk retired on 1 January 1978, and died on 14 September 1989 in Amsterdam, at the age of 76.
