= Zhou Zhenhe =

Chinese historical geographer and professor at Fudan University

Zhou Zhenhe (Chinese: 周振鹤; born 1941) is a Chinese historical geographer and a distinguished senior professor at the Institute of Historical Geography of Fudan University in Shanghai. His main research interests are cultural and administrative geography and history of Sino-foreign cultural relations. He is the chief editor of the 13-volume General History of Chinese Administrative Divisions, published between 2007 and 2016.

== Biography ==
Zhou was born in Xiamen, Fujian Province. From 1958 to 1963 he studied at the Department of Mining and Metallurgy of Xiamen University and then Fuzhou University. After graduation he worked for many years as an engineer at a coal mine in Hunan Province.

When the National Higher Education Entrance Examination was restored after the end of the Cultural Revolution, Zhou took and excelled in the graduate examination and was admitted to the graduate school of Fudan University to study historical geography under the famous scholar, academician Tan Qixiang. In 1983, Zhou and his classmate Ge Jianxiong became the first two recipients of the doctoral degree in humanities (文科博士) in the People's Republic of China. His Ph.D. dissertation was Administrative Geography during the Western Han Dynasty.

Zhou has been a faculty member of the Institute of Historical Geography of Fudan University since 1983, and became a Distinguished Senior Professor in 2008. His main research interests are cultural and administrative geography and history of Sino-foreign cultural relations. He has also taught as a visiting professor at many universities, including the University of Göttingen (1998 and 2000), Waseda University (1999), City University of Hong Kong (2000, 2003, 2006, 2008, 2011), Erlangen University (2002), and Kansai University (2008).

== Selected publications ==
Zhou Zhenhe is the chief editor of General History of Chinese Administrative Divisions, a 13-volume series covering the history of Chinese administrative divisions from the earliest dynasties (Shang and Zhou) to the Republic of China (1912–1949). It was published by Fudan University Press between 2007 and 2016. It is China's first comprehensive academic history of the country's administrative divisions and was one of the national key publishing projects supported by the General Administration of Press and Publication.

His other books include:

- with You Rujie, Chinese Dialects and Culture 方言与中国文化, Shanghai 1986, 2005. English translation (ISBN 978-1631818844) 2017.
- Administrative Geography during the Western Han Dynasty 西汉政区地理, Beijing 1987.
- The Way of Administrative Divisions 体国经野之道, Hong Kong 1990.
- Studies On Historical Cultural Divisions in China 中国历史文化区域研究 (chief editor), Shanghai 1997.
- Essays on the Relationship between Language and Culture 逸言殊语, Hangzhou 1998; Shanghai 2008.
- History on Local Administrative System in China 中国地方行政制度, Shanghai 1998, 2005.
- Historical Atlas of Shanghai 上海历史地图集 (chief editor), Shanghai 1999.
- Selected Works of Zhou Zhenhe 周振鹤自选集, Guilin 1999.
- Profession Diverted for Nineteen Years 学腊一十九, Jinan 2000.
- The Sacred Edict and Amplified: Collections of Explaining and Research 圣谕广训—集解与研究, Shanghai 2004.
- Collections of Business Booklist in Late Qing Times 晚清营业书目, Shanghai 2005.
- Changshui Shengwen (anthology) 长水声闻, Shanghai 2010.

In addition, he has published more than 100 academic papers.
