= Historical atlas =

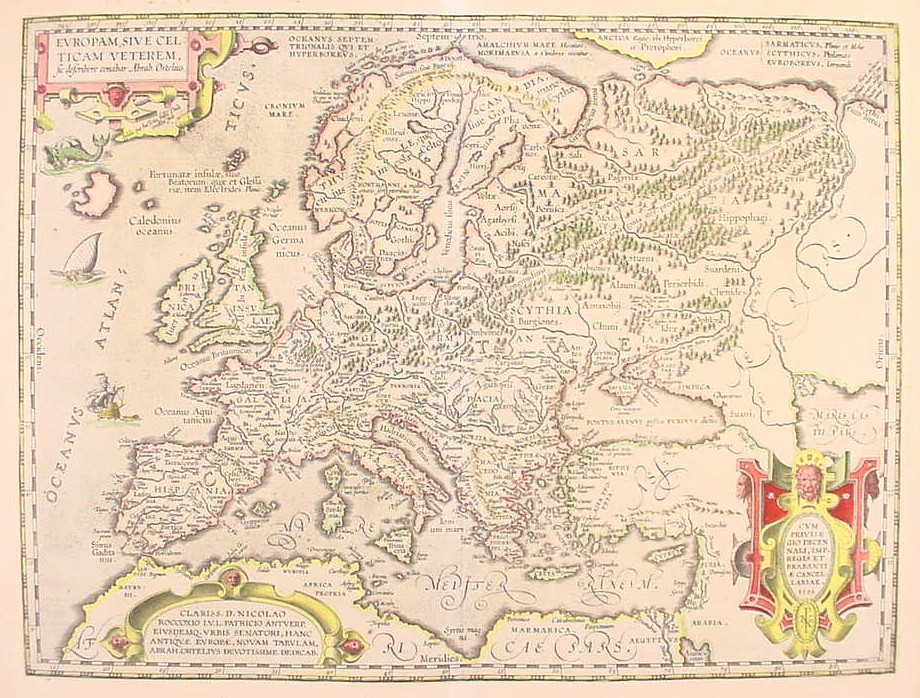
Europe at the time of the Celts (1595), a map from one of the first historical atlases, by Abraham Ortelius

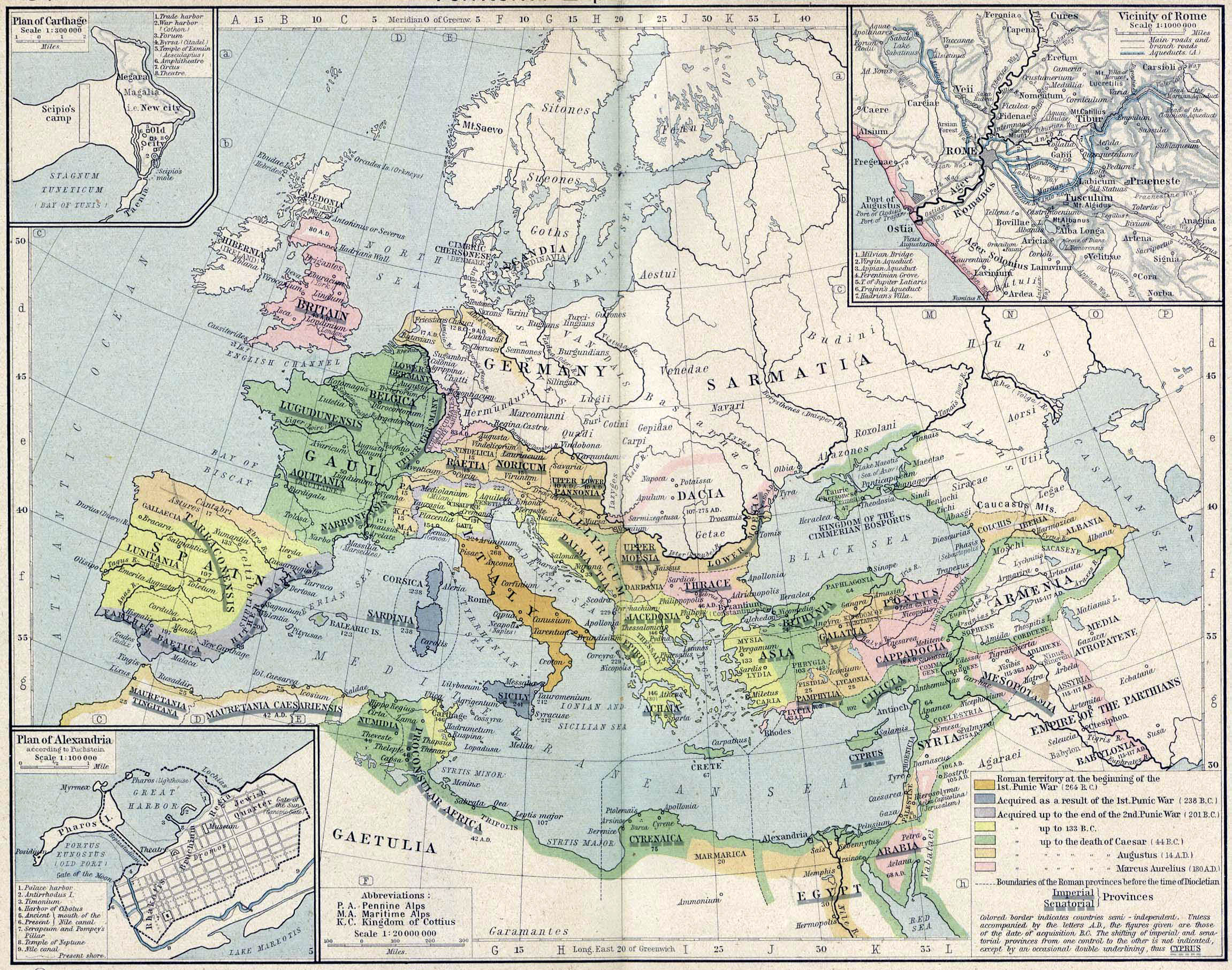
Map of expansion of the Roman Empire, published in the William R. Shepherd Historical Atlas in 1924

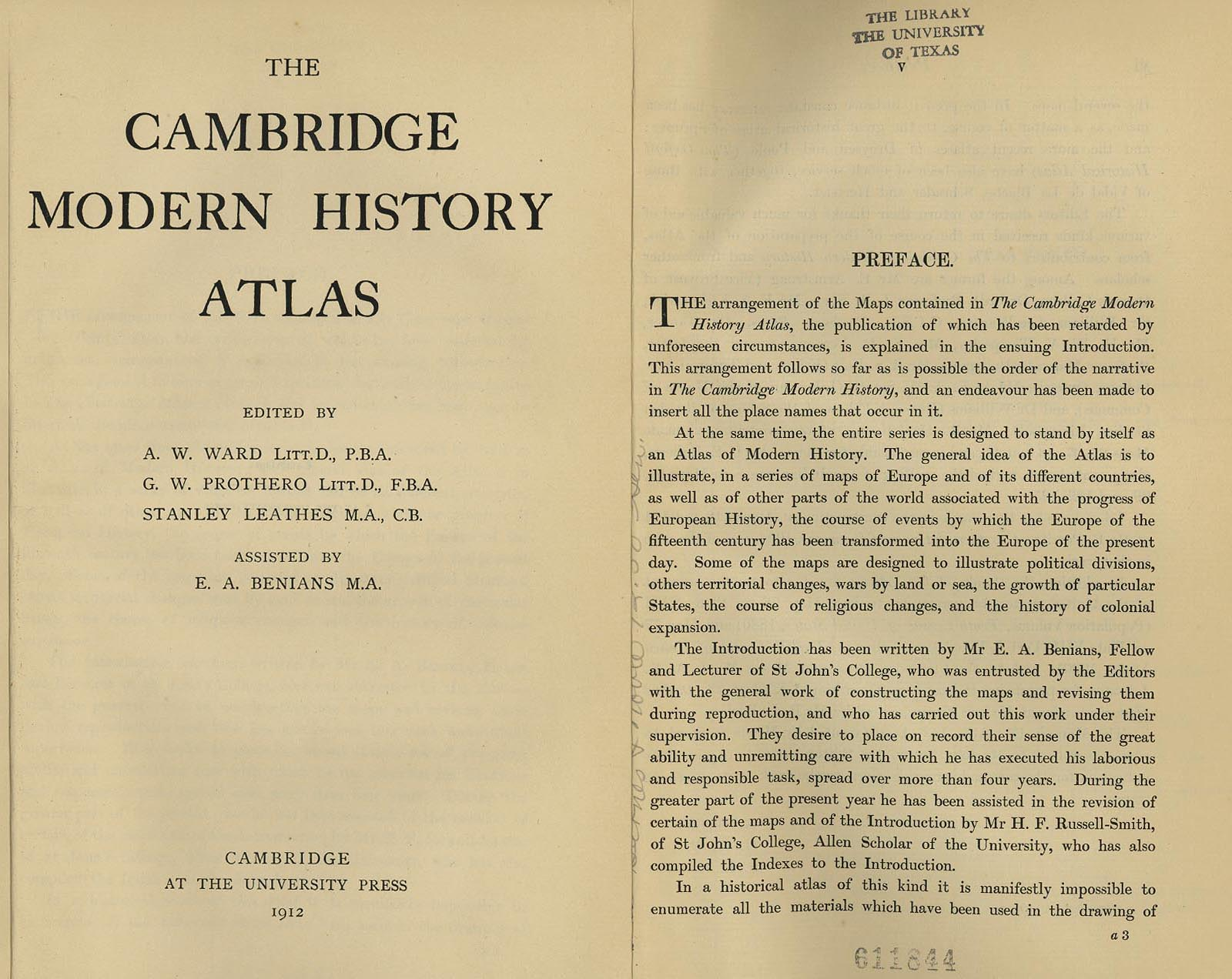
The preface to the 1912 Cambridge Modern History Atlas explains the purpose of a historical atlas

A historical atlas is a collection of maps and possibly illustrations that depict the historical geography of a particular region at a defined time period. These atlases typically include maps that show the political and cultural boundaries of different states as well as other data, and in some cases illustrations that provide information about important historical events and figures. They may also include timelines, charts, and other information to help readers understand the historical context of the maps. Historical atlases are used by scholars, students, and general readers to study and learn about the past.

Some try to present the entire history of the world, such as the Historical Atlas of the World, while others are more specialised, for only one time period or location, such as the Historical Atlas of the American West or The Historical Atlas of China.

The first known historical atlas may have been the Parergon by Abraham Ortelius in 1579, which was a supplement to the Theatrum Orbis Terrarum. William R. Shepherd produced a well-known historical atlas in 1911.

The first published historical atlas in systematically chronological order was the 1651 six-map atlas La Terre sainte en six cartes géographiques, covering the historical cartography of Palestine. The six maps covered land of Canaan and the Exodus, the Promised Land, Solomon's kingdom, the land of the Jews at the time of Christ, the Christian Patriarchate of Jerusalem, and the modern region.

== See also ==
- OpenHistoricalMap
