= Ge Jianxiong =

Chinese historical geographer (born 1945)

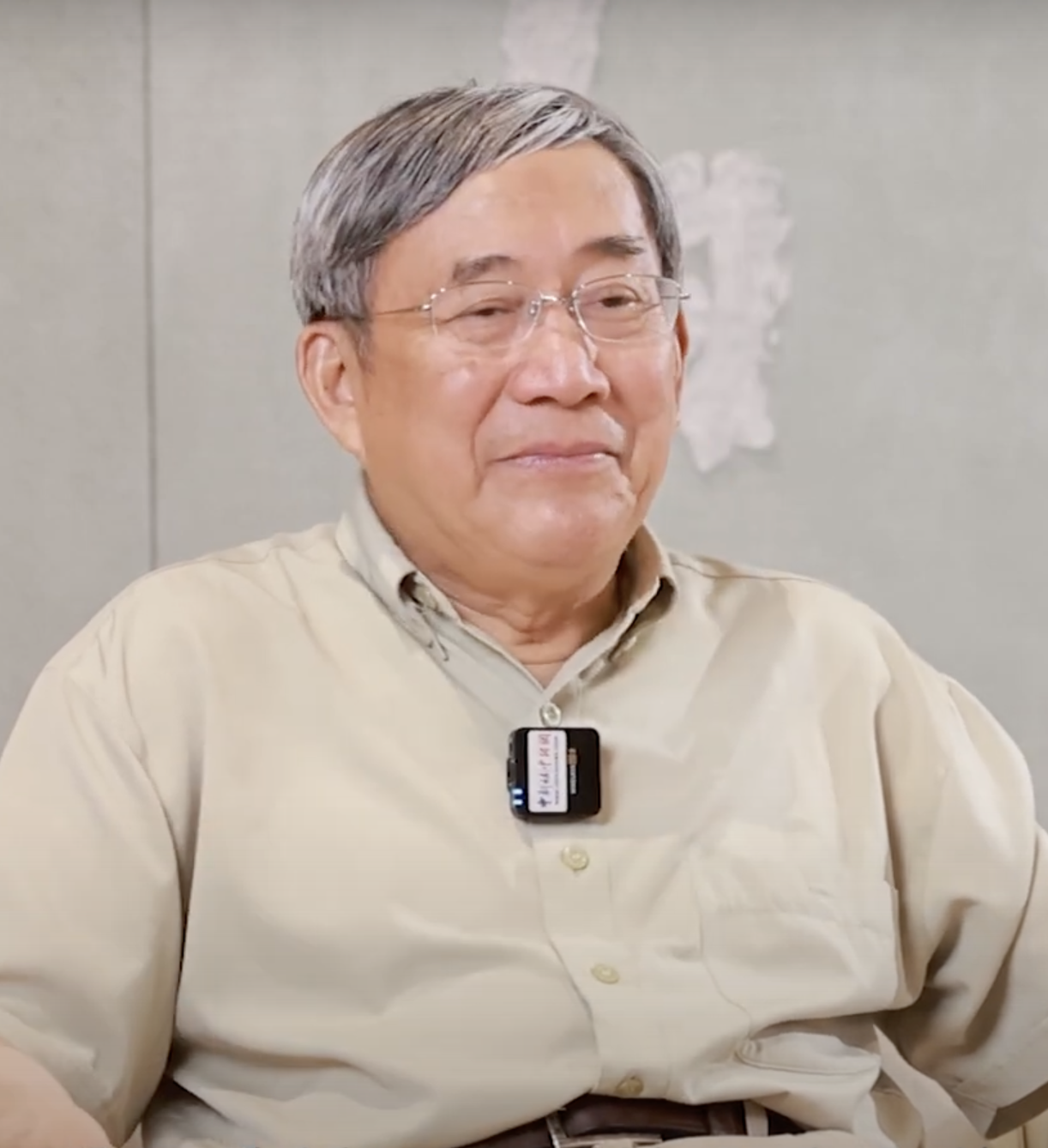
China News Service interviews Ge Jianxiong, Director of the Library of The Chinese University of Hong Kong (Shenzhen)

Ge Jianxiong (Chinese: 葛剑雄; born 15 December 1945) is a Chinese historical geographer. He is a professor and the former Director of the Institute of Historical Geography of Fudan University in Shanghai, and Director of the Fudan University Library. His research focus is on historical population movements and human geography. Ge is also a well-known public figure in China. He is a member of the Standing Committee of the Chinese People's Political Consultative Conference (CPPCC) and is on the Advisory Committee of the Shanghai Municipal Government.

== Biography ==
Ge Jianxiong was born on 15 December 1945 in Nanxun, Wuxing County (now Huzhou), Zhejiang, China. He graduated from Chang'an Middle School and Shibei High School. After a year of teacher's training, he taught at Gutian High School in Zhabei, Shanghai.

When the National Higher Education Entrance Examination was restored after the end of the Cultural Revolution, Ge took the graduate examination. Despite having never attended college, he excelled in the exam and was admitted to the graduate school of Fudan University to study historical geography under the famous scholar, academician Tan Qixiang. In 1981 he earned a master's degree in history, and in 1983, Ge and his classmate Zhou Zhenhe became the first two recipients of the doctoral degree in humanities (文科博士) in the People's Republic of China. His dissertation, Population Geography of the Western Han Dynasty, was published as a monograph by the People's Publishing House in 1986.

Ge has been a faculty member of the Institute of Historical Geography of Fudan University since 1981, and became a full professor in 1991. He served as Director of the Institute of Historical Geography from 1996 to 2006. He is also Director of the Fudan University Library.

He was a visiting scholar at Harvard University (1985–1986) and the University of Cambridge (1998), and a visiting professor at the School for Advanced Studies in the Social Sciences (1991) and the International Research Center for Japanese Studies (1997–1998).

Ge also writes popular columns and blogs in the mainstream media and is a well-known public figure in China. He is a member of the Standing Committee of the Chinese People's Political Consultative Conference (CPPCC) and is on the Advisory Committee of the Shanghai Municipal Government.

== Selected publications ==
Ge has published numerous books and articles, including:

- Population Geography of the Western Han Dynasty 西漢人口地理, 1986.
- Unity and Fragmentation 統一與分裂, ISBN 9787108006073, 1994.
- History of Migrations in China 中国移民史, ISBN 9787211029303, 1997.
- Changes in Boundaries and Administrative Divisions in Chinese History 中国历代疆域的变迁, ISBN 9787100024259, 1997.
- Population and Modernization in China since 1850
- China's Historical Geographic Studies in the Twentieth Century
- Emigrants and Chinese Traditional Culture, ISBN 9787203049210, 2004.
- Population History of China 中国人口史, ISBN 9787309043020, 2005.
