= Commentary on the Water Classic =

Work on Chinese geography in ancient times

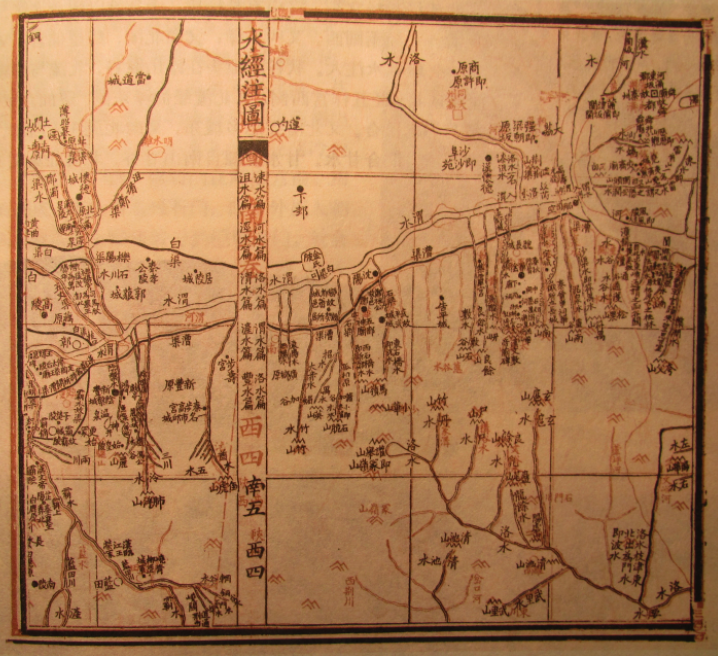
- A map of the Wei River from Shui Jing Zhu

Chinese name
- Traditional Chinese: 水經注
- Simplified Chinese: 水经注
Transcriptions
Standard Mandarin
- Hanyu Pinyin: Shuǐ Jīng Zhù
- Bopomofo: ㄕㄨㄟˇ ㄐㄧㄥ ㄓㄨˋ
- Wade–Giles: Shui^{3} Ching^{1} Chu^{4}
- IPA: [ʂwèɪ.tɕíŋ.ʈʂû]
Yue: Cantonese
- Yale Romanization: Séui Gīng Jyu
- Jyutping: seoi2 ging1 zyu3
- IPA: [sɵɥ˧˥.kɪŋ˥.tsy˧]

Vietnamese name
- Vietnamese alphabet: Thủy kinh chú
- Hán-Nôm: 水經注

Korean name
- Hangul: 수경주
- Hanja: 水經注
Transcriptions
- Revised Romanization: Sugyeongju

Japanese name
- Kana: すいけいちゅう
- Kyūjitai: 水經注
- Shinjitai: 水経注
Transcriptions
- Romanization: Suikeichū

The Commentary on the Water Classic (Chinese: 水经注), or Commentaries on the Water Classic, commonly known as Shui Jing Zhu, is a work on the Chinese geography in ancient times, describing the traditional understanding of its waterways and ancient canals, compiled by Li Daoyuan during the Northern Wei dynasty (386–534 AD). The book is divided into sections by river, each described with its source, course, and major tributaries, including cultural and historical notes.

The work is much expanded from its source text, the older (and now lost) Water Classic (Shuijing 水經). The original text described 137 different rivers in China and was traditionally credited to Eastern Han scholar and geographer Sang Qin (桑钦) during the Three Kingdoms period (220–280 AD). Qing dynasty scholars gave it a later date (during the Three Kingdoms period) because of the names of the counties and commanderies. Its authorship was then attributed to Jin dynasty scholar Guo Pu. Li Daoyuan's 40-volume, 300,000-character version includes 1252 rivers.

Together with the commentaries Wen Xuan zhu (by Li Shan), Pei Songzhi's Sanguozhi zhu, and Liu Xiaobiao's Shishuo Xinyu zhu, Li Daoyuan's work is regarded as one of the “Four Great Classical Commentaries” of China.

Although very thorough for its time, it did repeat the earlier mistake of the "Tribute of Yu" in viewing the Min river of Sichuan as the headwaters of the Yangtze. It was not until the Ming dynasty that Xu Xiake correctly listed the Jinsha as the principal source.

== See also ==
- Yang Shoujing and Xiong Huizhen, authors of the 19th-century annotation Shui Jing Zhu Shu (水經註疏)
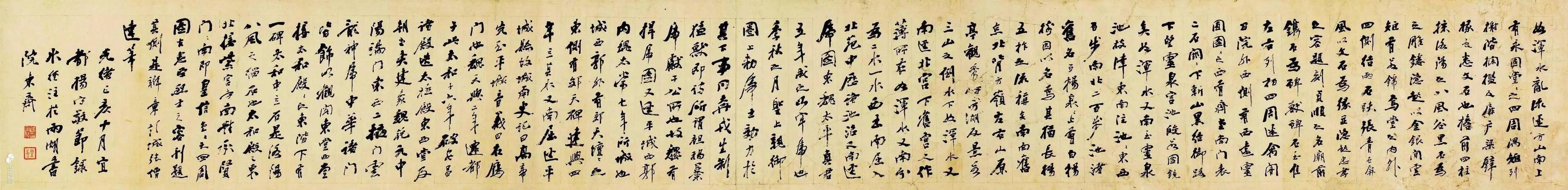
An excerpt from the Shui Jing Zhu, in Yang Shoujing's calligraphy (1899)
