= Historical Atlas of the World =

- Author: Oddavar Bjørkland, Haakon Holmboe, Andre Røhr Maps by: Berit Lie
- Language: English
- Genre: Atlas, History
- Publisher: Barnes & Noble
- Publication date: 1962
- Publication place: Norway
- Media type: Print (Paperback)
- Pages: ~170
- ISBN: 0-389-01087-1
- OCLC: 100071
- Dewey Decimal: 911
- LC Class: G1030 .B452 1970

Historical Atlas of the World is a historical atlas that contains 108 color maps showing religious boundaries, countries, cities, buildings, army movements and expeditions. It contains an index to place, peoples, historical and military events and explorers. Covers the span from 3000 BC to ~1970 (Rhodesia, not Zimbabwe; Pakistan, not Bangladesh; North and South Vietnam)

== Cappelens historiske atlas ==
In 1962, the Norwegian publishing house Cappelen issued an historical atlas in conjunction with the series Menneskenes liv og historie, popularly known as Grimberg's world history. The atlas became the 22nd and last volume in the series. In addition to 108 maps, it contained a registry of state leaders. (Carl Grimberg died in 1941, and posthumous editions of his books in Norway were revised by others.)

In 1983, Cappelen issued a new world history series Cappelens verdenshistorie in 21 volumes, again with the historical atlas as a supplement. The 166 maps therein were organized according to the chapters in the volumes. The editor was Anders Røhr, cooperating with the overall editor of Cappelens verdenshistorie, historian Knut Mykland.
