= General History of Chinese Administrative Divisions =

The General History of Chinese Administrative Divisions (Chinese: 中国行政区划通史; pinyin: Zhōngguó Xíngzhèng Qūhuá Tōngshǐ) is a series of Chinese-language books published by Fudan University Press covering the history of Chinese administrative divisions from the earliest dynasties (Shang and Zhou) to the Republic of China (1912–1949). It comprises 13 volumes (volumes 3 and 6 consist of two books each), published between 2007 and 2016. The general editor is Zhou Zhenhe, senior professor of Fudan University. The series is China's first comprehensive academic history of the country's administrative divisions. It was one of the national key publishing projects supported by China's General Administration of Press and Publication. A second edition of the entire series was published in September 2017.

== Volumes ==
The volumes of the series are as follows:

1. Overview and pre-Qin dynasty (by Zhou Zhenhe and Li Xiaojie 李晓杰)

First edition: January 2009, ISBN 978-7-309-05593-1, 686 pages.
Second edition: September 2017, ISBN 978-7-309-12696-9, 690 pages.

2. Qin and Han dynasties (by Zhou Zhenhe, Li Xiaojie, and Zhang Li 张莉)

First edition: November 2016, ISBN 978-7-309-11161-3, 1174 pages.
Second edition: September 2017, ISBN 978-7-309-12967-0, 1176 pages.

3. Three Kingdoms, Jin dynasty, and the Southern Dynasties (two books) (by Hu Axiang 胡阿祥, Kong Xiangjun 孔祥军, and Xu Cheng 徐成)

First edition: December 2014, ISBN 978-7-309-10429-5, 1730 pages.
Second edition: September 2017, ISBN 978-7-309-12680-8, 1730 pages.

4. Sixteen Kingdoms and the Northern Dynasties (by Mu Fasong 牟发松, Wu Youjiang 毋有江, and Wei Junjie 魏俊杰)

First edition: December 2016, ISBN 978-7-309-11163-7, 1157 pages.
Second edition: September 2017, ISBN 978-7-309-12968-7, 1347 pages.

5. Sui dynasty (by Shi Hejin 施和金)

First edition: April 2009, ISBN 978-7-309-05597-9, 577 pages.
Second edition: September 2017, ISBN 978-7-309-12697-6, 578 pages.

6. Tang dynasty (two books) (by Guo Shengbo 郭声波)

First edition: May 2012, ISBN 978-7-309-05598-6, 1514 pages.
Second edition: September 2017, ISBN 978-7-309-12698-3, 1599 pages.

7. Five Dynasties and Ten Kingdoms (by Li Xiaojie)

First edition: December 2014, ISBN 978-7-309-10523-0, 1133 pages.
Second edition: September 2017, ISBN 978-7-309-12681-5, 1133 pages.

8. Song dynasty and the Western Xia (by Li Changxian 李昌宪)

First edition: August 2007, ISBN 978-7-309-05599-3, 800 pages.
Second edition: September 2017, ISBN 978-7-309-12699-0, 801 pages.

9. Liao and Jurchen Jin dynasties (by Yu Wei 余蔚)

First edition: May 2012, ISBN 978-7-309-05600-6, 959 pages.
Second edition: September 2017, ISBN 978-7-309-12700-3, 959 pages.

10. Yuan dynasty (by Li Zhi'an 李治安 and Xue Lei 薛磊)

First edition: April 2009, ISBN 978-7-309-05601-3, 376 pages.
Second edition: September 2017, ISBN 978-7-309-12701-0, 377 pages.

11. Ming dynasty (by Guo Hong 郭红 and Jin Runcheng 靳润成)

First edition: August 2007, ISBN 978-7-309-05602-0, 839 pages.
Second edition: September 2017, ISBN 978-7-309-12702-7, 969 pages.

12. Qing dynasty (by Fu Linxiang 傅林祥, Lin Juan 林涓, Ren Yuxue 任玉雪, and Wang Weidong 王卫东)

First edition: October 2013, ISBN 978-7-309-05603-7, 794 pages.
Second edition: September 2017, ISBN 978-7-309-12703-4, 796 pages.

13. Republic of China (1912–1949) (by Fu Linxiang and Zheng Baoheng 郑宝恒)

First edition: August 2007, ISBN 978-7-309-05604-4, 797 pages.
Second edition: September 2017, ISBN 978-7-309-12704-1, 801 pages.

== See also ==
- The Historical Atlas of China by Tan Qixiang
