= Historical Atlas of the American West =

1989 historical atlas

- 1989 edition
- Author: Warren A. Beck, Ynez D. Haase
- Language: English
- Genre: Non-fiction
- Publisher: University of Oklahoma Press
- Publication date: 1989
- Publication place: United States

Historical Atlas of the American West is a historical atlas and a standard reference work depicting the history and geography of the seventeen states comprising the American West. Written by Warren A. Beck and Ynez D. Haase, the atlas was published by the University of Oklahoma Press in 1989.

Each map is accompanied by a one-page description of the events depicted. The historical maps cover many periods; from the Spanish land grants to prisoner-of-war camps during World War II. The atlas also contains many maps of geological and meteorological interest as well as the agriculture and flora and fauna of the West.
