= Historical geography =

Sub-branch of human geography

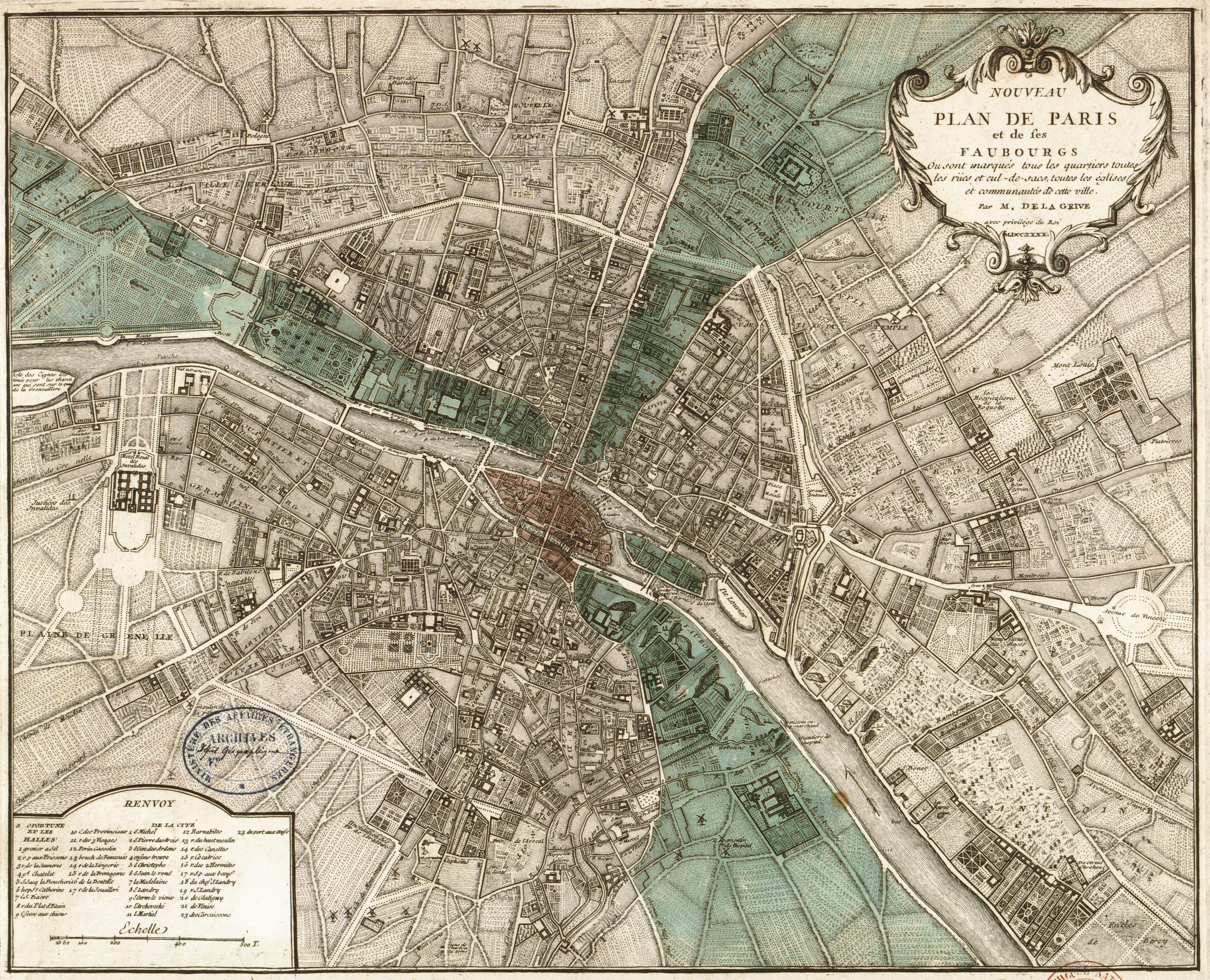
A 1740 map of Paris.

Ortelius World Map, 1570

Historical geography is the branch of geography that studies the ways in which geographic phenomena have changed over time. In its modern form, it is a synthesizing discipline which shares both topical and methodological similarities with history, anthropology, ecology, geology, environmental studies, literary studies, and other fields. Although the majority of work in historical geography is considered human geography, the field also encompasses studies of geographic change which are not primarily anthropogenic. Historical geography is often a major component of school and university curricula in geography and social studies. Current research in historical geography is being performed by scholars in more than forty countries.

== Themes ==
This sub-branch of human geography is closely related to history, environmental history, and historical ecology.

Historical geography seeks to determine how cultural features of various societies across the planet emerged and evolved by understanding their interaction with their local environment and surroundings.

More recent studies make use of non-traditional methods, such as botany and archeology.

== Development of the discipline ==
In its early days, historical geography was difficult to define as a subject. A textbook from the 1950s cites a previous definition as an 'unsound attempt by geographers to explain history'. Its author, J. B. Mitchell, came down firmly on the side of geography: 'the historical geographer is a geographer first last and all the time'. By 1975 the first number of the Journal of Historical Geography had widened the discipline to a broader audience: 'the writings of scholars of any disciplinary provenance who have something to say about matters of geographical interest relating to past time'.

In the United States, the term historical geography is the name given by Carl Ortwin Sauer of the University of California, Berkeley to his program of reorganizing cultural geography (some say all geography) along regional lines, beginning in the first decades of the 20th century. To Sauer, a landscape and the cultures in it could only be understood if all of its influences through history were taken into account: physical, cultural, economic, political, environmental. Sauer stressed regional specialization as the only means of gaining sufficient expertise on regions of the world. Sauer's philosophy was the principal shaper of American geographic thought in the mid-20th century. Regional specialists remain in academic geography departments to this day. Despite this, some geographers feel that it harmed the discipline; that too much effort was spent on data collection and classification, and too little on analysis and explanation. Studies became more and more area-specific as later geographers struggled to find places to make names for themselves. These factors may have led in turn to the 1950s crisis in geography, which raised serious questions about geography as an academic discipline in the USA.

== List of historical geographers ==
- Yohanan Aharoni
- M. R. G. Conzen
- William Cronon
- William Morris Davis
- Ge Jianxiong
- Patrick Geddes
- Elisabeth Gottschalk
- Torsten Hägerstrand
- Peter Hall
- Cole Harris
- Hou Renzhi
- Sa'd ibn Junaydil
- Anne Kelly Knowles
- Roy Marom
- Donald W. Meinig
- Brandon Plewe
- Carl O. Sauer
- Tan Qixiang
- Charles W. J. Withers
- John Kirtland Wright
- Paul Vidal de la Blache
- Xiong Huizhen
- Yang Shoujing
- Zhou Zhenhe

== Major institutions ==
- The Historical Geography Specialty Group of the American Association of Geographers
- The Historical Geography Research Group of the Royal Geographical Society

== Major journals ==
- Journal of Historical Geography
- Historical Geography

== See also ==
- Historical atlas
