= Dong Zuobin =

Chinese archaeologist (1895–1963)

- 董作賓
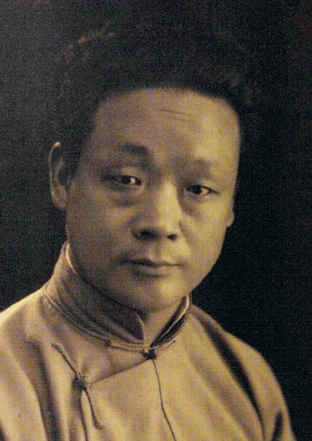
- Dong Zuobin (probably c. 1930)
- Born: March 20, 1895; Nanyang, Henan, Qing dynasty
- Died: November 23, 1963 (aged 68); Taiwan
- Occupations: Archaeologist, sinologist, professor
- Known for: Establishing the chronology of the Shang dynasty

Academic background
- Education: Peking University

Academic work
- Discipline: Archaeology, sinology
- Sub-discipline: Archaeology of China, Ancient Chinese history
- Institutions: National Zhongshan University; National Taiwan University; Academia Sinica
- Main interests: Oracle bone script, Shang dynasty
- Notable works: Jiaguwen duandai yanjiu li (1932); Yinxu wenzi, jia pian (1941)

Dong Zuobin
- Chinese: 董作賓
Transcriptions
Standard Mandarin
- Hanyu Pinyin: Dǒng Zuòbīn
- Wade–Giles: Tung Tso-pin

Dong Zuobin or Tung Tso-pin (1895–1963) was a Chinese archaeologist. He was a leading authority on the oracle bone and turtle shell inscriptions of the Shang dynasty (1600-1046 BC). In 1928, Dong supervised the first archaeological dig of Anyang, the Shang capital. Dong was a professor at National Taiwan University and director of the Institute of History and Philology at Academia Sinica from 1950 to 1954. Dong's construction of a Shang chronology was his most important research achievement.

== Early life ==
Dong was born 20 March 1895 to a shopkeeper's family in Nanyang in southern Henan Province. His talent for calligraphy and writing were already noticed when he was a child. As a result, he was employed by a local seal engraver when he was about 11 or 12. As his father needed help in the shop, Dong could not begin formal education until 1915. In 1922, Dong went to Beijing to audit classes at Peking University and enrolled the following year.

== Career ==
Dong became a professor at National Zhongshan University in Guangzhou in 1927. Alongside Gu Jiegang, Rong Zhaozu, and Zhong Jingwen, he co-founded the Folklore Society of SYSU, the first such folkloristics society in China. He visited Anyang in the summer of 1928 and found that villagers were still digging up oracle bones and shells and selling them, as they had been since around 1895. Although many scholars assumed that thirty years of looting had already removed all valuable items, Dong's visit led him to suggest an archaeological dig. His university approved the dig and he supervised fieldwork in October 1928. This was the first systematic dig of the Anyang site. Some 784 items were uncovered.

There was a total of fifteen expeditions to Anyang before work was interrupted by the Sino-Japanese War. These expeditions were directed by Li Ji, and Dong participated in most of them. The most spectacular discovery, made in June 1937, was Pit H127. This underground chamber housed the archives of two Shang kings. Three tons of finds were removed from this pit.

In March 1932, Dong's breakthrough work, Jiaguwen duandai yanjiu li, was published. The work gave ten criteria for dating an inscription within the Shang dynasty. It also gave the genealogy of the Shang kings, terms of address used in the inscriptions, names of foreign countries used, grammatical constructions, and ideographic constructions. Publication of the inscriptions themselves was delayed due to wartime conditions and the arduous process of preparation. Dong finally able to published this important work in Hong Kong in 1941 as Yinxu wenzi, jia pian [Texts from Yinxu, first collection].

Dong accepted an invitation to lecture on oracle bone inscriptions in the United States in January 1947. He lectured at both University of Chicago and at Yale. He returned to China in late 1948 and immediately began work on evacuating his department to Taiwan.

Among Dong's achievements was his division of the evolution of the oracle bone script into five stages. He also correlated various Shang calendars with lunar eclipses. His research also led to a chronological identification of the twelve kings who ruled Anyang for 273 years beginning 14 January 1384 BC. He also worked out the dates of individual reigns and the rounds of ancestral sacrifice. Dong died in Taiwan on 23 November 1963.
