= Tan Qixiang =

Chinese geographer and historian (1911–1992)

Tan Qixiang 谭其骧
- Born: 25 February 1911; Shenyang, Liaoning, China
- Died: 28 August 1992 (aged 81); Shanghai
- Education: Jinan University (Shanghai); Yenching University
- Known for: The Historical Atlas of China
- Scientific career
- Fields: Historical geography
- Workplaces: Fudan University; Zhejiang University
- Notable students: Wang Zhongshu; Ge Jianxiong; Zhou Zhenhe

Chinese name
- Simplified Chinese: 谭其骧
Transcriptions
Standard Mandarin
- Hanyu Pinyin: Tán Qíxiāng
- Wade–Giles: T'an Ch'i-hsiang

Courtesy name
- Simplified Chinese: 季龙
Transcriptions
Standard Mandarin
- Hanyu Pinyin: Jìlóng

Tan Qixiang (Chinese: 谭其骧; 25 February 1911 − 28 August 1992) was a Chinese geographer and historian who is considered a founder of the field of historical geography in Modern China. His magnum opus, the eight-volume The Historical Atlas of China, was published between 1982 and 1988. He was elected to the Chinese Academy of Sciences in 1981.

== Early life ==
Tan Qixiang was born on 25 February 1911 at the Huanggutun railway station in Shenyang, Liaoning. Soon after his birth, he was brought back to his hometown of Jiaxing, Zhejiang. After attending Xiuzhou High School in Jiaxing, he briefly studied sociology at Shanghai University in 1926 before transferring to Jinan University (then located in Shanghai), where he graduated from the history department in 1930.

In 1930, he entered the graduate school of Yenching University in Beiping (now Beijing), where he studied under the prominent historian Gu Jiegang and graduated in 1932.

== Career ==
From 1932 to 1936, he worked as a lecturer of historical geography and history at several universities in Beiping, including Yenching, Fu Jen Catholic University, Peking University, and Tsinghua University. In the 1930s, Gu and Tan cofounded the Yugong Society (禹贡学会) and the journal Chinese Historical Geography (Chinese name Yugong).

In 1940, Tan joined Zhejiang University and then relocated to inland Guizhou province due to the Japanese invasion of China, as an associate professor. In 1946, after the surrender of Japan, Tan moved to Hangzhou with Zhejiang University, which was moved back to its original campus. From 1947 to 1949, he taught at both Zhejiang University and his alma mater Jinan University in Shanghai. After the founding of the People's Republic of China in 1949, Jinan University was closed, and most of its departments were merged into Fudan University. Tan became a history professor at Fudan, where he stayed for the rest of his career. He was the head of the Department of History of Fudan starting in 1957 and became an academician of the Chinese Academy of Sciences in 1981. From 1982 to 1986, he served as director of the Institute of Historical Geography of China at Fudan University.

== The Historical Atlas of China ==
His most important work is The Historical Atlas of China, which is also regarded as the most significant work in the field of historical geography in China. He began working on the atlas in 1955 and partly based it on the work of Qing dynasty scholar Yang Shoujing. It took him more than 30 years to complete the work, and the eight-volume atlas was published from 1982 to 1988. The atlas consists of 304 maps covering thousands of years of Chinese history until the Qing Dynasty and includes over 70,000 place names. The atlas contains many maps that are politically sensitive, especially on Tibet and Xinjiang. According to his student Ge Jianxiong, Tan was under strong political pressure to make the historical Tibet appear smaller, but he insisted on being faithful to history and included Xinjiang as Tibetan territory during the late 8th century, and his version was eventually approved by China's then-reformist leader, Hu Yaobang.

== Students ==
His students include Wang Zhongshu, who studied history with him at Zhejiang University and later became one of the most prominent archaeologists in Asia. At Fudan University, students Zhou Zhenhe and Ge Jianxiong, now well-known historians, were the first two recipients of the doctoral degree in humanities (文科博士) in the People's Republic of China.

== See also ==
- General History of Chinese Administrative Divisions, a 13-volume series envisioned by Tan Qixiang and completed by his students
