= Li Daoyuan =

Chinese geographer, writer, and politician during the Northern Wei dynasty

- Traditional Chinese: 酈道元
- Simplified Chinese: 郦道元
Transcriptions
Standard Mandarin
- Hanyu Pinyin: Lì Dàoyuán
- Bopomofo: ㄌㄧˋ ㄉㄠˋ ㄩㄢˊ
- Wade–Giles: Li^{4} Tao^{4}-yüan^{2}
- IPA: [lî tâʊ.ɥɛ̌n]
Yue: Cantonese
- Yale Romanization: Lihk Douh'yùhn
- Jyutping: lik6 dou6 jyun4
- IPA: [lɪk̚˨ tɔw˨.jyn˩]

Li Daoyuan (simplified Chinese: 郦道元; traditional Chinese: 酈道元; pinyin: Lì Dàoyuán; 466 or 472 in Zhuo County, Hebei – 527) was a Chinese geographer, politician, and writer during the Northern Wei dynasty. He is known as the author of the Commentary on the Water Classic (Shuijingzhu), a monumental work on China's geography in ancient times.

Li used his position as an official with business in different places to carry field investigations. He is known to have visited the area belonging to the present-day Henan, Shandong, Shanxi, and Jiangsu provinces.

Another source for his knowledge was the study of ancient geographical books he had access to, like the Classic of Mountains and Seas (Shanhaijing) completed by the time of the early Western Han dynasty and the Water Classic (Shuijing), written by Sang Qin during the Three Kingdoms period and later commentated on by Jin dynasty writer Guo Pu. Li vastly expanded the Water Classic, doing his own research and fieldwork. The original Water Classic has not survived but covered 127 rivers and streams and contained about 10,000 characters; Li's Commentary on the Water Classic discusses 1252 watercourses and contains about 300,000 characters in total. The book maps and describes the rivers and streams along with the history, geography and culture of the surrounding region.
