= Gu Jiegang =

Chinese historian (1893–1980)

- 顾颉刚
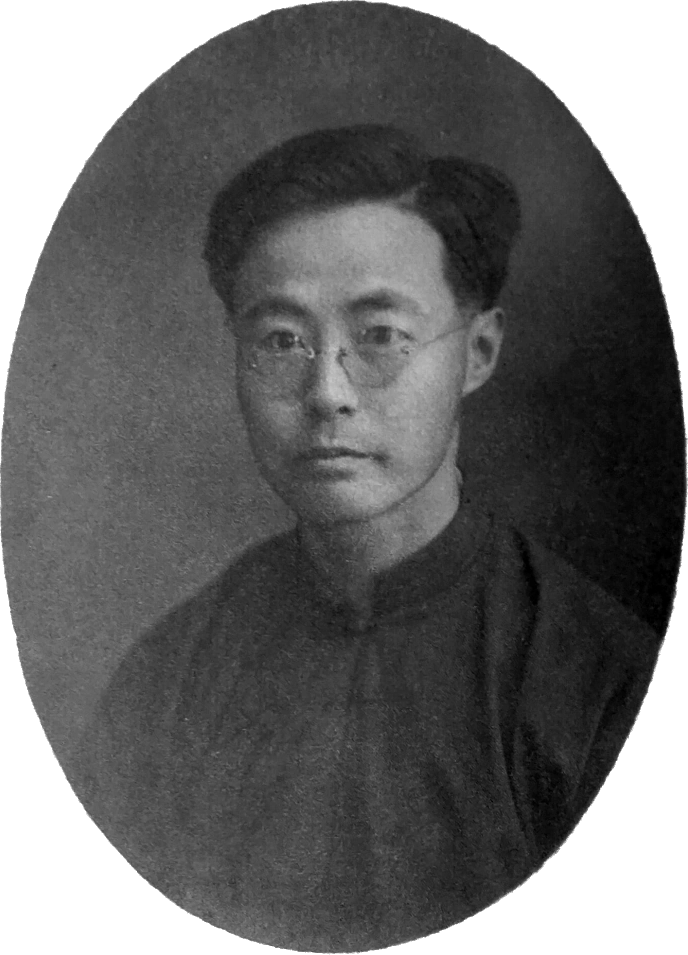
- Gu Jiegang, c. 1920s
- Born: 8 May 1893; Suzhou, Jiangsu, Qing China
- Died: 25 December 1980 (aged 87); Beijing, People's Republic of China

Academic background
- Education: Peking University

Academic work
- Discipline: Historian
- Sub-discipline: Chinese folklorism and philology
- Institutions: Peking University, Xiamen University, Sun Yat-sen University, Yenching University, Chinese Academy of Sciences, Chinese Academy of Social Sciences
- Notable works: Gushi Bian

Chinese name
- Traditional Chinese: 顧頡剛
- Simplified Chinese: 顾颉刚
Transcriptions
Standard Mandarin
- Hanyu Pinyin: Gù Jiégāng
- Wade–Giles: Ku^{4} Chieh^{2}-kang^{1}
- IPA: [kû tɕjě.káŋ]

Gu Jiegang (8 May 1893 – 25 December 1980) was a Chinese historian, philologist, and folklorist, noted for his critiques of traditional historiography. Born to a family of scholars in Suzhou, he developed a great interest in philology and the Chinese classics from an early age. He became involved in radical politics following the 1911 Revolution, but grew disillusioned and began to focus on historical studies. He was admitted to Peking University, where became interested in critique of the classical histories, inspired by academics such as Wang Guowei and Hu Shih. After graduating in 1920, he was hired by the university; he became active in the study of folk songs and folklore while continuing his classical philological studies. He initiated a wave of scholarly controversy between the Doubting Antiquity School and conservative academics in 1923 after he published letters criticizing legendary ancient figures such as Emperor Yao and Emperor Shun as unhelpful Confucian myths. He later edited the large volume of responses he received in the aftermath into the first volume of the Gushi Bian (古史辨; 'Debates on Ancient History'), a seven-volume work published from 1926 to 1944.

Political and economic tensions forced Gu to leave Beijing in 1926. After only a few months at Xiamen University, where he feuded with novelist Lu Xun, he was employed by his former roommate Fu Ssu-nien at Sun Yat-sen University, where he continued to study folklore while managing a research and history department. He moved to Yenching University in 1929, where he taught philology courses and edited several periodicals, including a historical geography journal he founded with a student. Initially a staunch critic of the Kuomintang's nationalistic view of history, he grew more sympathetic towards it following the outbreak of the Second Sino-Japanese War in 1937 and the university's evacuation to Chongqing.

He served in various educational and editorial positions following the war. In 1950, he was forced to condemn his former colleague Hu Shih under pressure from the incipient Communist government; possibly in exchange for his criticism of himself and Hu, he was appointed to head the Institute of History of the Chinese Academy of Sciences in Beijing in 1954. He was condemned during the Cultural Revolution; while nominally still a professor, his position was demoted to janitorial duties. Despite being barred from his own library, he continued his studies of the Book of Documents in secret. He returned to academics after he was tasked by Zhou Enlai to participate in the production of modern punctuated versions of the orthodox histories. He was gradually rehabilitated during the 1970s, and continued academic work until his death in 1980.

== Early life and education ==
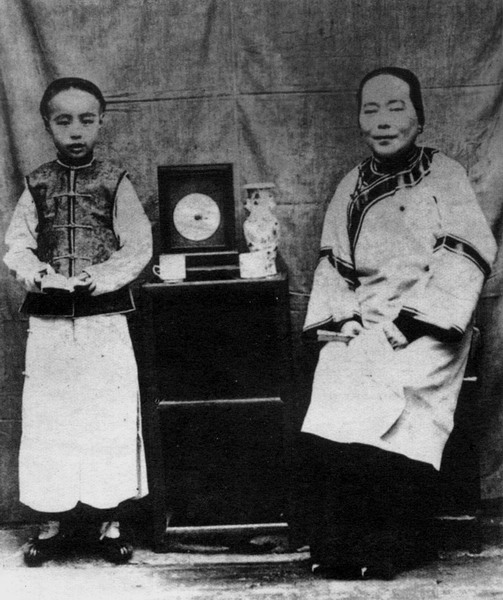
A young Gu Jiegang and his grandmother, c. 1900

On 8 May 1893, Gu Jiegang was born in Daoyi, a village in eastern Suzhou, Jiangsu. Suzhou was a center of scholarship during the late Qing dynasty; both his father and grandfather were prominent local academics, descended from the 17th-century scholar-official Gu Yanwu. As Gu was the eldest child in his family, his paternal grandfather took a strong interest in his education from an early age; an expert in classical literature and textual criticism, he instructed Gu in a traditional manner with a strong focus on the classics and histories. Gu had developed a strong interest in literature by six or seven, to which he later attributed a speech disorder and a lack of artistic skill.

Gu was fascinated by historical texts such as the Zuo Zhuan, although his grandfather forbid him from reading them until he was first taught the Odes and the Book of Rites (two of the Five Classics) by a private tutor. The focus on the most archaic and difficult classics immensely frustrated Gu, who later wrote that his instructor "had sacrificed me on the altar of his pedagogy." After his family subscribed to the Xinmin Congbao in 1903, Gu read the essays of the political theorist Liang Qichao. Gu was introduced to modern critiques of classical works through books brought home by his father, including a scathing critique of Han Yu's Yuandao by Yan Fu.

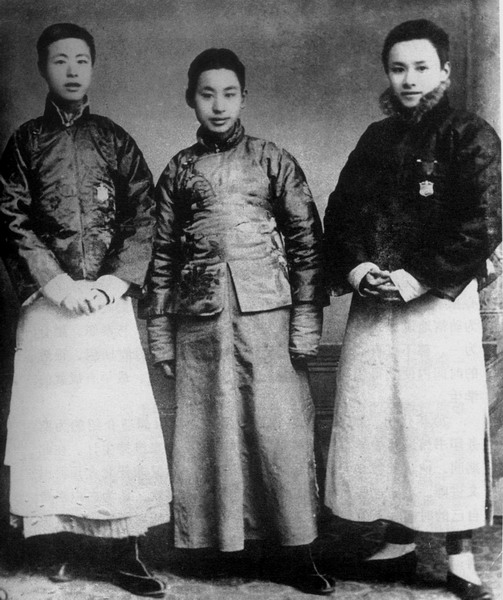
Gu Jiegang (left) with fellow Socialist Party members Ye Shengtao and Wang Boxiang, c. 1912

After the imperial examination system was abolished in 1905, Gu entered private school, attending a class taught by his father at a residence north of Suzhou. After his father was admitted to Peking University (abbreviated Beida), the class was taught by a rapid succession of teachers, and he became essentially self-taught. In 1906, he transferred to a grammar school in Suzhou, which taught a mix of traditional and western-style material; disappointed in this modernized education, his grandfather continued giving him separate instruction in the Classics. He later graduated into a local secondary school. Gu bemoaned private school as "paltry and vulgar", but also valued its focus on science and field research. In 1909, he took entrance exams into a prominent academy in Suzhou, but failed due to an entrance essay which criticized Zheng Xuan's interpretations of the Classics. His grandfather died around this time, leaving Gu to pursue increasingly heterodox study material, taking particular inspiration from the work of Tan Sitong.

On 27 January 1911, Gu was entered into an arranged marriage with Wu Zhenglan. Wu was four years older than Gu, and largely illiterate, although Gu attempted to teach her to read and write. They had two daughters. In 1912, Gu published an article under Wu's name in the Funü Shibao, a prominent early Chinese women's magazine.

The teenage Gu was greatly inspired by the 1911 Revolution and joined the Socialist Party of China, declaring that the revolution was not finished until it "had abolished government, had discarded the family system, and had made currency unnecessary". However, he was quickly frustrated by cynicism within the party and left. The deteriorating political situation in China in the years following the revolution disillusioned many academics, including Gu. Yuan Shikai rose to power as a dictator in the aftermath of the revolution, leading to a conservative crackdown on academia. Gu wrote that "of all the joyous emotions and fervent hopes that we had heaped up in previous years, we now had left only melancholy memories."

== University career ==
In 1913, Gu passed the entrance exams of Peking University. He was disappointed by academic conservatism at Beida and ignored his coursework in favour of attending Peking opera. He found friendship in fellow student Mao Zishui. Mao introduced Gu to the lecturer Zhang Taiyan, who reinvigorated his studies. Gu increasingly focused on the scholarship of antiquity, stating that he had lost interest in "contemporary affairs". After reading the work of 18th-century historian Zhang Xuecheng the following year, Gu became dedicated to disproving the notion that a Golden Age occurred in ancient Chinese history.

He was introduced to the conflict between the New and Old Texts through the lectures of Zhang Binglin, one of the most influential philologists of the period. Gu was unimpressed by Zhang, who was a proponent of the Old Texts; he aligned somewhat with the work of Kang Youwei, who accused the Old Texts of being Han dynasty forgeries. Contemporary scholar Wang Guowei was another major influence of Gu's early thought on classical literature.

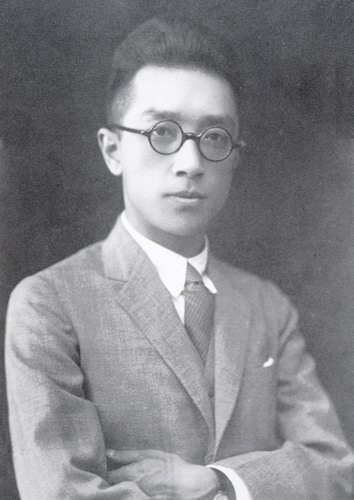
Hu Shih in 1917. Hu formed a major influence on Gu's historical thought.

In 1917, Gu met philosophy professor Hu Shih, who had recently returned from study in the United States. He was inspired by Hu's heterodox views of Chinese history, and lured his conservative roommate Fu Sinan into attending his lectures. Writing to Fu in August 1919, Gu stated that "all learning must start with history". He came to believe that Chinese historians needed to divorce themselves from the orthodox histories and draw from both Chinese and Western historical traditions in order to better understand China as a nation. Inspired by Hu Shih, he advocated for the study of national heritage through the scientific method, although admitted that he had limited knowledge of its particulars.

Towards the end of 1917, Gu returned to Suzhou to care for his wife, who had fallen gravely ill. She died of tuberculosis the following year, leaving Gu depressed and in poor health. He recuperated in Suzhou for some time before returning to Beijing near the end of the year. Gu did not participate in the protests of 4 May 1919, or mention them in his writings. Alongside Fu, Luo Jialun, and Yu Pingbo, Gu was a co-founder of the student journal New Tide and its eponymous student organization, intended to rival the counterculture magazine New Youth. Like the university itself under chancellor Cai Yuanpei, the New Wave strongly opposed politics, regarding it as the domain of bureaucrats and warlords.

In 1919, Gu's relatives forced him to remarry, despite his strong reservations. Inspired by a regular folksong column in the Peking University Daily, he began to turn towards folklore and poetry studies, and joined the university's Folksong Research Society. During his stays in Suzhou, he collected a variety of local rhymes and songs; these were published the Beijing Morning Post in October 1920. He graduated from Beida in 1920, and was appointed the assistant librarian of the institute.

== Early academic career ==
In his librarian position, Gu was able to read a variety of historiographical texts, including critiques of the Old Texts by earlier generations of scholars such as Zheng Qiao, Yao Jiheng, and Cui Shu. He briefly became an assistant lecturer at Beida's newly founded postgraduate institute in 1921. That year, he began to edit the Anthology of Critical Studies on Ancient Documents (辨偽叢刊), intended to serve as a complete anthology of Chinese textual studies. He focused on past scholars, especially from the Qing period, who challenged orthodox historical narratives. Biographical sketches were included with entry, and were generally themed around the scholar's frustration by the academic orthodoxy. The "first collection" of the anthology was later published as a ten volume series from 1928 to 1935. By the 1930s, Gu acknowledged that he had been overly ambitious with his plans for the series, and that its completion would require the work of a large team of specialists over more than a lifetime.

In 1922, Gu was forced to return again to Suzhou to mourn for his deceased grandmother. On Hu's urging, the Shanghai-based Commercial Press hired Gu as a history editor during this period, where he edited a secondary school textbook titled Elementary National History. Alongside scholar Chang Hui and archaeologist Dong Zuobin, he served on the editorial staff of the Folksong Research Society's periodical Folksong Weekly, which entered production in December 1922. The success of the Folksong Weekly and a growing interest in other forms of folk culture among its members led to the formation of the Customs Survey Society on 14 May 1923.

=== Doubting antiquity ===
During his stay in Suzhou, he corresponded with linguist Qian Xuantong on the myths and tropes of ancient Chinese history, questioning the historicity of figures such as the Three Sovereigns and Five Emperors. In 1923, he collected and published his letters as an article in the supplement to the Shanghai Nuli Zhoubao, which he edited while Hu was ill. This article outlined his stratification theory on ancient Chinese history; Gu wrote that many elements of ancient Chinese history had their origin in layers of ancient myths, which were later manipulated to adhere to Confucian principles beginning in the Qin and Han periods. Although other scholars such as Kang Youwei had dismissed ancient figures such as Emperor Yao and Emperor Shun as mythical, Gu went beyond Kang's views to state that such myths had no symbolic normative use in the present. The publication of these letters resulted in a large number of responses from both supporters and opponents of his views across various major journals and newspapers, pitting the emerging Doubting Antiquity School against the more conservative historians, a movement sometimes labeled "Believing Antiquity School (信古派). Gu compiled his article and its responses into the first volume of his Gushi Bian (古史辨; 'Debates on Ancient History'), which would ultimately become a seven-volume work published from 1926 to 1944.

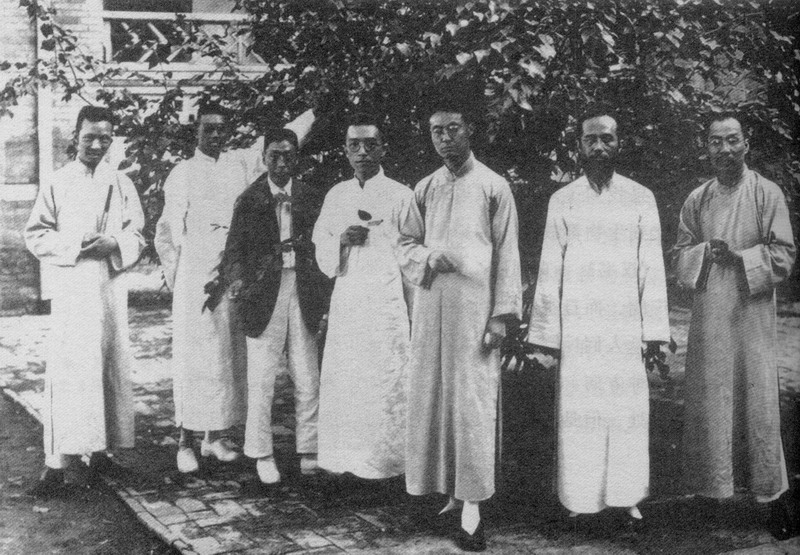
Gu (third from right) with editors and contributors to the Weekly Review of the Institute of Sinology, 1924. Hu Shih stands by him, fourth from right.

=== Last years at Beida ===
Gu returned to Beijing in the spring of 1924. He served as the substitute editor-in-chief of the Folksong Weekly in 1924 and early 1925. Advocating for the journal to cover a wider spectrum of folk culture, he participated in a survey of the temple fair on Mount Miaofeng alongside Rong Zhaozu and Sun Fuyuan and published a series of articles on folklore in the Literary Supplement to Beijing News. He produced a major study on the legend of Lady Meng Jiang, editing together various folk songs, drawings, epigraphs, and Baojuan (mystical prosimetric texts) based on the story. These were published in the Folksong Weekly in a series of nine special issues. In June 1925, Folksong Weekly was discontinued to make way for a new, broader publication, the Weekly Review of the Institute of Sinology. Gu continued to submit articles for this new publication, including his research on Meng Jiang.

By 1925, the faculty at Beida faced great difficulties securing their wages; the Ministry of Education frequently held back academic salaries for months, paying back only small portions if at all. Gu described the professors' income as "hardly enough for bare subsistence"; professors had frequently gone on strike to secure back pay, but the national government had begun treating such actions as serious political subversion. Gu, depressed at the state of his career and Chinese society, continued to write despite financial difficulties. He continued work on the Gushi Bian, publishing its first volume in 1926, alongside an autobiography which was later translated into English by Arthur W. Hummel Sr. as The Autobiography of a Chinese Historian. Meanwhile, the political situation in Beijing had deteriorated. Police opened fire on a student protest in March, leading many professors to flee Beijing and find employment elsewhere. By the end of the year, fighting had broken out in the city between the forces of Feng Yuxiang and rival warlords Wu Peifu and Zhang Zuolin. Gu left Beijing in October, accepting a job offer at Xiamen University in Fujian.

=== Xiamen and Sun Yat-sen University ===
Under the administration of university president Lim Boon Keng, Xiamen emerged as a center of cultural studies, recruiting many scholars displaced from Beida. Lim recruited Lin Yutang as the dean of the School of Letters and the general secretary of the National Studies Institute. Lin hired Gu, Sun Fuyuan, and the novelist Lu Xun as professors for the institute at a high salary. This attracted many more scholars from Beijing, including Rong Zhaozu. In late 1926, the faculty of the institute, including Gu, organized a weekly newsletter and a Customs Survey Society. Gu and Rong were appointed the chief editors of the newsletter, which began publication on 5 January 1927. Gu chose to specialize in studying the tombstones of the city. He also traveled to nearby Quanzhou to survey temples to the local Land God.

Gu feuded with Lu Xun at Xiamen; Lu denounced him as a member of the "Hu Shih Clique" and felt that he was overly influential in the university. In a short story titled Controlling the Waters, Lu featured a stuttering caricature of Gu named Mister Birdshead (鳥頭先生), making fun of both his physical appearance and lifelong speech disorder. Parodying Gu's theories on the mythical origins of Yu the Great, Mister Birdshead argues that Yu could not have been historical, as his named contained a radical meaning "insect", and insects are unable to divert floods. Lu left the university in January 1927, primarily for financial reasons. He later accused Gu of participating in the repression of student demonstrators while at Xiamen. Funding difficulties and layoffs led Gu to leave the university soon after; the National Studies Institute dissolved in mid-February 1927.

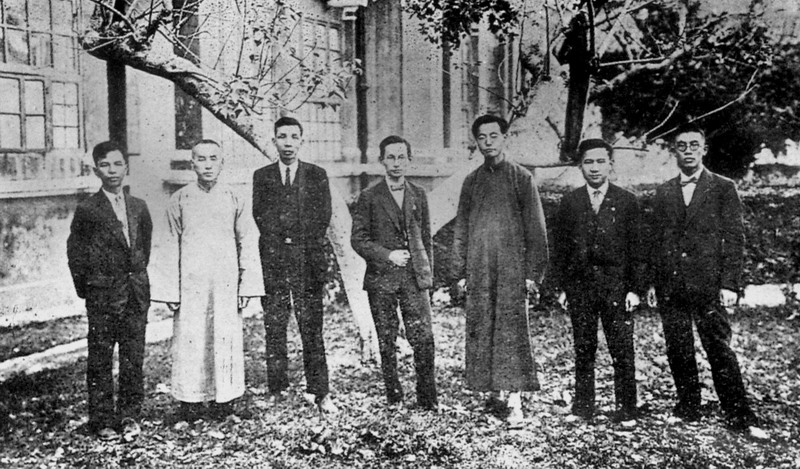
Gu (third from right) with other members of the Sun Yat-sen University Archaeological Society, 1928

Gu found new employment in the spring of 1927. His former roommate Fu Sinan, now chairing two departments at Sun Yat-sen University in Guangzhou, offered him a position within the history department. Gu accepted, and began a five-month journey through Shanghai, Zhejiang, and Jiangsu to purchase books for the institution; he returned with around 120,000 titles. Lu Xun, who had also been hired at Xiamen, was outraged that Gu had been hired, and threatened to resign from his position if the offer was not suspended; Fu replied that he himself would resign if Gu was not able to work at the university. Despite attempts at mediation by the university administration, Lu soon left and went to Wuchang.

Alongside Fu, Gu managed the university's new Research Institute of Linguistics and History, modeled after Beida's Institute of Sinology. Gu founded a folklore society at the university in November 1927 and served as its president. He served as supervisor of its journal Folklore Weekly alongside Rong Zhaozu, while Zhong Jingwen served as its editor. The journal became the longest running folklore periodical of the Republican era, running for 123 issues; it ran continuously from 1928 to 1930, and intermittently continued publication until 1943. Fu Sinan was enthusiastic to see Gu's contributions. In a letter published in the Journal of Sun Yat-Sen University in January 1928, he dubbed Gu the "Newton and Darwin of ancient Chinese history" and the "king of historiography". In December 1928, Gu was appointed the director of the university's Research Institute of Philology and History.

=== Yenching ===
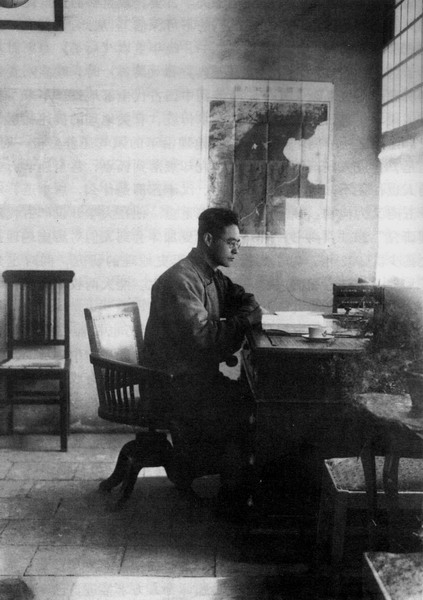
Gu at the Yugong Society office, 1937

Gu returned to Beijing and began teaching at the Yenching University and the Harvard–Yenching Institute in 1929, where he directed the university's history department. While at Yenching, he edited the Yenching Journal and Tongsu Duwu, a popular literature magazine with a strong nationalist and anti-Japanese orientation. He concurrently worked at the National Academy of Peking, one of China's main research institutes. Gu received a high and consistent salary at Yenching. He taught courses on the scholarship of the Han dynasty and the Book of Documents.

In March 1931, Gu Jiegang founded a historical geography journal with his graduate student Tan Qixiang. Titled Yugong Biweekly (after the Yu Gong, an ancient geography text within the Shujing), articles within the journal were generally written by Gu's graduate students and supervised by Tan as chief editor. Students from Fu Jen Catholic University in Beijing began submitting articles to the journal after Tan began teaching there in the early 1930s. The journal avoided taking a doctrinal approach to following particular scholars, with Gu and Tan writing in the journal's first issue that they "want to completely break this 'heroic' thinking to admit that neither some people nor ourselves are absolutely right." Due to this anti-doctrinal stance, the contributors to the Yugong Biweekly were hesitant to classify themselves as a distinct school of historical thought. The journal was initially privately funded from Gu and Tan's salaries.

The Nationalist government, now in control of Beijing, began a crackdown on academic institutions. Universities were forbidden from allowing art and social science departments to have more students than their science and engineering counterparts. Due to its denial of an ancient Chinese golden age, the Kuomintang prevented Gu's textbook Elementary National History from being used in schools, and issued a large fine on the Commercial Press for its publication. Due to political pressures, the Yugong Biweekly was forced to adopt a nationalistic footing in its research. Writing to Fu Sinan to request government subsidies in October 1935, Gu emphasized the nationalistic origins of the journal, stating that its intention was to "inspire readers to take back our lost territory and to build up a solid basis for nationalism". Gu was able to secure funding for his graduate students to stay in academia after negotiations with Fu. This resulted in the formation of the Yugong Society at Yenching in early 1934. Gu and Tan were elected secretaries of the society alongside Feng Jiasheng and Qian Mu.

In 1936, alongside Yang Xiangkui, Gu published the Study of the Three Sovereigns (三皇考), a survey of the mythological rulers of the Three Sovereigns and Five Emperors era. In the book, Gu heavily criticizes the Kuomintang's historiography, describing the concept of the Five Races (Note: Comprising the Han, Manchu, Mongols, Hui, and Tibetans.) descended from the Yellow Emperor as historically incorrect and as a misguided lie for the sake of national unity.

=== Wartime ===
After the Marco Polo Bridge incident and the outbreak of the Second Sino-Japanese War, Gu was forced to flee Beijing. After visiting Gansu and Qinghai under sponsorship from the Sino-British Cultural Endowment Fund, he settled in Chongqing. Due to his conflicts with the Kuomintang, he was excluded from a national conference on high school history and geography education. He grew more receptive to nationalistic views of history, seeing it as useful to counter Japanese propaganda. He worked with the Kuomintang to promote the myths which he had previously discredited.

At a meeting in Chengdu in 1940, nationalist politician and educational minister Chen Lifu asked Gu if Emperor Yu's birthday was known. Gu responded that Yu was legendary, but that the ancient Qiang traditionally celebrated his birthday on the sixth day of the sixth month of the Chinese lunar calendar. Chen published a paper proclaiming that Gu had confirmed Yu's birthday, leading other skeptic scholars to criticize Gu as inconsistent in his views on the emperor's historicity. Although academics continued criticizing his prior work, Gu ceased publication in educational journals following the outbreak of the war, and had difficulties advancing in academia; he wrote in his diary that he was past his prime as a researcher. He considered stepping away from academic research, and began working with publishing businesses. Yang Xiangkui was saddened by Gu's retreat from academic study and repeatedly urged him to return to research in 1943. Gu was greatly taken aback, and sought to rebuild his academic relationship with his former students. He attempted to reestablish the Yugong Society in 1943 with several of his colleagues, but was unsuccessful.

== Postwar career ==
Under increasing political opposition from both left-wing and right-wing sources, Gu returned to Suzhou in July 1947, where he worked as a teacher and edited the periodical Popular Literature (民眾讀物). He moved to Shanghai in May 1949, where he transferred between various teaching positions. By 1954, he served as the chief editor of the Silian Publishing House. He was appointed to various honorary postings in the early years of the People's Republic, serving as Suzhou's delegate to the Regional People's Representatives' Conference from 1950 to 1953, and as honorary representative to the Chinese People's Political Consultative Conference in 1954. That year, he also served on the Jiangsu Provincial Board for the Maintenance of Cultural Assets.

Gu was accused of being a philosophical ally of Hu Shih as part of a growing political campaign against Hu and his pragmatism. Gu had broken with Hu several decades prior, accusing Hu of taking credit for work done by his students and preventing them from publishing it. Despite this falling out, some of Gu's colleagues had been pressured into writing critiques of Gu, Hu, and the "clique of antiquity doubters". He was called upon to give an address condemning Hu in 1950. He declared Hu his "personal and political enemy", although mainly recounted experiences at Beida, and reserved strong criticism to a small portion at the end of the statement.

=== Return to Beijing ===
In September 1954, Gu returned to Beijing to serve as the head of the newly created Institute of History of the Chinese Academy of Sciences. He initially declined the offer, but accepted after a new rank of professorship was created for him, alongside a 500-yuan/month salary. In December 1954, he delivered a self-criticism address to the Political Consultation Conference, possibly in exchange for his appointment to the academy. He praised the Communist Party, firmly condemned Hu Shih, and criticized his own past disagreements with Lu Xun in the mid-1920s, stating that he was overly academic and individualistic in the face of Lu's "progressive, revolutionary" views. Some radicals continued to oppose Gu and his work. His former student and colleague Yang Xiangkui criticised Gu from a Marxist perspective during the 1950s. Yang began working at the Institute of History under the prominent Marxist historian Yin Da; although Yang and Gu would go on to work in the same institute for over twenty years, they refused to speak with one another due to ideological differences.

From 1955 to the end of 1958, he additionally worked alongside He Cijun (賀次君) to compile a modernized, punctuated version of the Shiji for the Zhonghua Book Company. Gu and He initially drew from several dozen editions of the Shiji. However, Gu soon abandoned the idea of an extensive variorum and switched to a version based on an 1870 edition by Zhang Wenhu. Zhonghau deemed Gu's initial manuscript of this version overly technical, and the task was instead given to Shiji specialist Song Yunbin, incorporating only some of Gu's unfinished drafts of the front and back matter for its 1959 release. In early 1960, Gu worked alongside Rudolf Viatkin (the vice-president of the Soviet Academy of Sciences) to assist in the production of a Russian translation of the Shiji.

During this period, he hoped to compile a manual entitled Draft Assessment of the Dates of Formation of Ancient Chinese Books (中国古书年代的初步考订), but was forced to scale back ambitions due to political pressures of the period. He fell ill in May 1957, and spent the rest of the year in Qingdao to recuperate, only returning to Beijing the following January. He welcomed a number of technological advances in archaeology, including computers and radiocarbon dating, believing that they would increase the pace of scientific progress.

=== Cultural Revolution ===
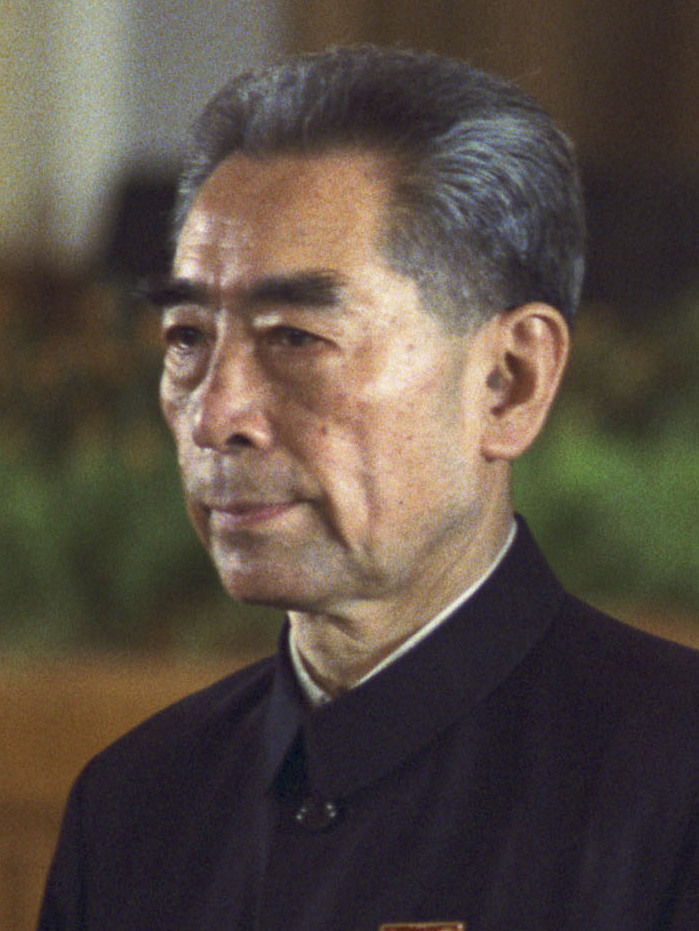
Premier Zhou Enlai's request for the Zhonghua Book Company to resume editing the orthodox histories was crucial in rehabilitating many Chinese historians, including Gu.

Unlike many other academics, he was able to avoid relocation to the rural countryside during the Cultural Revolution (1966–1976) due to poor health. Although nominally still a professor of the academy, his position was reduced to janitorial duties in his department, and his salary was dramatically reduced. Gu was condemned by big-character posters as a "reactionary academic authority" and subject to surveillance by the Red Guards. His library (totaling over 70,000 volumes) was sealed off, leaving him to continue his studies on the Book of Documents based on the small amount of material which survived alongside his own memory of the classic. In order to avoid the suppression of his research, he wrote using fountain pen in primary school copybooks he left on his children's desks; due to their stark contrast from his previous notebooks, Gu referred to them as his "special books".

Political attitudes during the Cultural Revolution strongly criticized academics, dubbing them the "Stinking Old Ninth". Many of Gu's colleagues were coerced into suicide or mental breakdowns, including Tong Shuye and Zhou Yutong. Additionally, xenophobic policies led to Gu being unable to contact foreign academics or use foreign texts for his research. Gu was particularly dismayed by the historiography employed by the revolutionaries, including the rehabilitation of the forged Guwen Shangshu.

=== Later career and death ===
In 1971, Premier Zhou Enlai ordered the Zhonghua Book Company to continue its stalled project to produce modern punctuated versions of the orthodox histories. He recalled a large number of academics from the countryside and retirement to work on the project, including Gu alongside other noted historians such as Bai Shouyi, Wang Zhonghan, Yang Bojun, and Zhang Zhenglang. As the Cultural Revolution died down, Gu was gradually rehabilitated; his last book published before the revolution was reprinted in 1977. Although now in his mid-eighties, Gu drew up a number of plans for his future work, divided between three year, five year, and eight year plans beginning in 1978. In the new political environment, he heavily criticized the academia of the Cultural Revolution and what he termed the "Gang of Four Historiography" after one of the revolution's prominent political factions.

Unsolved problems such as that of the New and Old Texts simply have to await further investigation by those coming after us. Such work has been done for 1,000 years and will be continued by another 100 generations. How can anybody say its time is past and gone?

— Gu Jiegang, preface to a reprint of Gushi Bian, 1979–1980

In 1977, the Chinese Academy of Social Sciences was split off of the Academy of Science, with Gu promoted to executive member of the new academy's history department. With his former students Liu Qiyu and Wang Xuhua serving as aides, he organized a large body of work into what would become posthumous publications. Gu served in various boards and advisory positions during the late 1970s; he served as a member of the China Federation of Literary and Art Circles, vice-president of the Chinese Folklore Research Society, and as a member of the Association of Chinese Historians and the Chinese Historical Archive's Society. He additionally served on the editorial boards of the journal Studies on the Dream of the Red Chamber (红楼梦学刊) and the periodical Historical Geography (历史地理).

In June 1979, he served as a delegate to the 5th National People's Congress. His health began to decline soon after, prompting an extended hospital stay; during this time, he was continuously visited by representatives of periodicals requesting articles, prompting Gu to describe them as "much like tax-collectors: one going, the other coming!" When his health rendered it difficult to write and he became bedridden, he dictated to his assistant Wang. He received visits from a number of historians, including western Sinologists, who had been largely shut-off from the country since the 1940s. On 25 December 1980, Gu died from a stroke at a hospital in Beijing. He gave his body to the Chinese Academy of Medical Sciences for research. in 1982, a collection of his papers on historical geography were posthumously published as the eighth volume of the Gushi Bian in the first republication of the series since the Chinese Communist Revolution.

== Historical thought ==
Through Hu, who studied under the American educational reformer John Dewey, Gu's historical methods were indirectly influenced by western historiography and philosophy; although he described his historical arguments as an independent invention. Likely aware of the general currents of international historical studies and Sinology, Gu does not directly reference any foreign-language texts or studies, despite some knowledge of French, English, Japanese, and German. Although sympathetic to aspects of historical materialism and Marxist historiography, particularly the incorporation of socioeconomic factors into historical analysis, Gu was opposed to the concept of economic determinism and a distinct progression through varying modes of production. He instead advocated for a pluralistic approach to historical studies incorporating a variety of sources. In his 1971 biography of Gu, historian Laurence Schneider described him as an empiricist with a "unquenchable, though far from crippling, skepticism".

Gu greatly respected 18th- and 19th-century scholars such as Zhang Xuecheng and Cui Shu, but saw their work as tarnished by Confucian ideals. He was strongly critical of the idea of a golden age in China's ancient past, and saw the Five Classics not as authentic documents from the purported ancient past, but as lenses through which to analyze the Warring States and Han dynasty societies which produced the texts. Gu embraced the spurious Old Texts, often dismissed as Han forgeries, as valuable reflections of the Han dynasty. He wrote that prior to the formalization of these texts, the Hundred Schools of Thought during the Warring States period offered a relatively free and open scholarly discourse. He dismissed the Qin dynasty's burning of books and burying of scholars as the main reason for this decline in scholarly discourse, instead positing that it had become too profitable for scholars not to work alongside the state; this led to scholars increasingly working to provide legitimacy and means of social control to the ruling class, leading to the domination of Confucianism as a state orthodoxy.

We want to have the men of antiquity only be men of antiquity and not leaders today. We want to have ancient history only be ancient history and not be the ethical teachings of today. We want ancient books to only be ancient books and not be today's resplendent repositories of the law.

— Gu Jiegang, preface to Gushi Bian vol. 4, 1930

Gu believed that the history and rulers of the Xia dynasty stemmed from myth. He was sympathetic to skeptical historians such as Chen Mengjia and Yang Kuan, who argued against its existence, but wrote that it was difficult to assert that its existence was entirely falsified. In a 1923 letter to Qian Xuantong, he theorized that the mythical founder of the Xia dynasty, Yu the Great, was a deified animal depicted on the Nine Tripod Cauldrons who was later reimagined as a human ruler. He changed his theories on Yu's origins several times, alternatively attributing the myth to the Western Zhou or the Warring States period, but maintained that he originated as a mythological figure.

Gu strongly differentiated the "people of China" (中国人民) from the Han ethnicity, stating that the latter were only able to survive historically due to the steady arrival of other ethnic groups into China, such as the Wuhu, Khitan, Jurchen, and Mongols. He was strongly supportive of the incorporation of minority ethnic groups within the Chinese nation, although opposed historically to the concept of the Five Races descended from common mythic ancestors. He theorized that the Han ethnicity formed from the Qin dynasty's unification of China and use of commanderies as administrative divisions on the frontiers.

== Notes ==
=== Sources ===
- Boorman, Howard L., ed. (1968). "Ku Chieh-kang". Biographical Dictionary of Republican China. Vol. 2. Columbia University Press. pp. 245–247. ISBN 9780231089586.
- Chen, Minzhen (2019). "Faithful History or Unreliable History: Three Debates on the Historicity of the Xia Dynasty". Journal of Chinese Humanities. 5. Translated by Fordham, Carl Gene: 78–104. doi:10.1163/23521341-12340073.
- Ding, Yannan (2021). "Decentralisation of Historical Geography in China 2006–2020". Geography Compass. 15 (1) e12550. Bibcode:2021GComp..15E2550D. doi:10.1111/gec3.12550.
- Duara, Prasenjit (1995). Rescuing History from the Nation: Questioning Narratives of Modern China. University of Chicago Press. ISBN 9780226167237.
- Fan, Xin (2010). "Gu Jiegang and the Creation of Chinese Historical Geography". The Chinese Historical Review. 17 (2): 193–218. doi:10.1179/tcr.2010.17.2.193.
- Gao, Jie (2019). Saving the Nation through Culture: The Folklore Movement in Republican China. Vancouver: University of British Columbia Press. doi:10.59962/9780774838405. ISBN 9780774838382.
- Geng, Yunzhi (2015). An Introductory Study on China's Cultural Transformation in Recent Times. China Academic Library. Springer-Verlag. doi:10.1007/978-3-662-44590-7. ISBN 9783662445891.
- Gu, Jiegang (1931). The Autobiography of a Chinese Historian: Being the Preface to a Symposium on Ancient Chinese History (Ku Shih Pien). Translated by Hummel, Arthur W. Brill. doi:10.1163/9789004599260. OCLC 221734678.
- Hon, Tze-ki (1996). "Ethnic and Cultural Pluralism: Gu Jiegang's Vision of a New China in His Studies of Ancient History". Modern China. 22 (3). doi:10.1177/009770049602200303.
- Hon, Tze-ki; Culp, Robert J., eds. (2007). The Politics of Historical Production in Late Qing and Republican China. Brill. ISBN 9789004160231.
  - Hon, Tze-ki; Culp, Robert J. "Introduction". 1–20.
  - Chan, Wai-keung. "Contending Memories of the Nation: History Education in Wartime China, 1937–1945". 169–210.
- Judge, Joan (2015). Republican Lens: Gender, Visuality, and Experience in the Early Chinese Periodical Press. University of California Press. doi:10.1525/california/9780520284364.003.0001. ISBN 9780520284364.
- Lai, Guolong (2018). "Digging up China: Imperialism, Nationalism, and Regionalism in the Yinxu Excavation, 1928–1937". In Lai, Guolong; Effros, Bonnie (eds.). Unmasking Ideology in Imperial and Colonial Archaeology: Vocabulary, Symbols, and Legacy. Cotsen Institute of Archaeology Press at UCLA. pp. 83–120. doi:10.2307/j.ctvdjrrt0.11. ISBN 978-1-938770-13-5. JSTOR j.ctvdjrrt0.11.
- Lai, Guolong; Wang, Q. Edward (2017). "Manuscript Culture in Early China: Editor's Introduction". Chinese Studies in History. 50 (3): 167–171. doi:10.1080/00094633.2017.1420287.
- Lu, Zongli (2007). "A Short Biography of Professor Zhang Zhenglang". Chinese Literature: Essays, Articles, Reviews. 29: 200–213. JSTOR 25478409.
- Nienhauser, William H. (1995). "Historians of China". Chinese Literature: Essays, Articles, Reviews. 17: 207–216. doi:10.2307/495591. JSTOR 495591.
- Richter, Ursula (1982). "Gu Jiegang: His Last Thirty Years". The China Quarterly. 90: 286–295. doi:10.1017/S0305741000000369.
- Richter, Ursula (1993). "Historical Skepticism in the New Culture Era: Gu Jiegang and the 'Debate on Ancient History'" (PDF). 近代中国史研究集刊 [Bulletin of Modern Chinese History]. 23. Academia Sinica: 355–389.
- Schneider, Laurence A. (1969). "From Textual Criticism to Social Criticism: The Historiography of Ku Chieh-kang". The Journal of Asian Studies. 28 (4): 771–788. doi:10.2307/2942411. JSTOR 2942411.
- Schneider, Laurence A. (1971). Ku Chieh-kang and China's New History: Nationalism and the Quest for Alternative Traditions. University of California Press. ISBN 9780520018044.
- Wagner, Rudolf G. (2019). "The Global Context of a Modern Chinese Quandary: Doubting or Trusting the Records of Antiquity". Monumenta Serica. 67 (2): 441–504. doi:10.1080/02549948.2019.1681801.
- Wang, Q. Edward (2001). Inventing China through History: The May Fourth Approach to Historiography. State University of New York Press. doi:10.2307/jj.18254478. ISBN 9780791491829. JSTOR jj.18254478.
- Wilkinson, Endymion Porter (2012). Chinese History: A New Manual. Harvard University Asia Center. ISBN 978-0-674-06715-8.
- Zhang, Longxi (1995). The Ambiguity of Cultural Identity: Gu Jiegang and the Rethinking of the Chinese Tradition (PDF). Association for Asian Studies. pp. 1–7.
