= The Historical Atlas of China =

Atlas (1982–1988)

- Editor: Tan Qixiang
- Language: Chinese
- Genre: Atlas, History
- Publisher: China Cartographic Publishing House
- Publication date: 1982–88
- Publication place: China
- Media type: Print

The Historical Atlas of China (traditional Chinese: 中國歷史地圖集; simplified Chinese: 中国历史地图集; pinyin: Zhōngguó lìshǐ dìtú jí) is an 8-volume work published in Beijing between 1982 and 1988, edited by Tan Qixiang. It contains 304 maps and 70,000 placenames in total. The Concise Historical Atlas of China (Chinese: 简明中国歷史地图集; pinyin: Jiǎnmíng Zhōngguó lìshǐ dìtú jí) was published in 1991.

== Contents ==
The atlas consists of 8 volumes:

1. Archaeological findings, Xia, Shang, Western Zhou, Spring and Autumn period and Warring States period
2. Qin dynasty, Western and Eastern Han dynasties
3. Three Kingdoms and Western Jin dynasty
4. Eastern Jin dynasty, Sixteen Kingdoms and Southern and Northern Dynasties
5. Sui dynasty, Tang dynasty and Five Dynasties and Ten Kingdoms period
6. Song dynasty, Liao dynasty and Jin Empire
7. Yuan dynasty and Ming dynasty
8. Qing dynasty

On each map, ancient places and water features are shown in black and blue respectively, superimposed on modern features, borders and claims, shown in brown. All country-wide maps, from Paleolithic onward, include an inset showing the nine-dash line in the South China Sea. Placenames are given in simplified characters, though an edition of the atlas published in Hong Kong uses traditional characters.

== Reception ==
The Atlas is considered the most authoritative compendium of ancient place names and administrative boundaries, and a tremendous improvement on its predecessor, Yang Shoujing's Lidai yudi tu (Yangtu, "Yang's atlas", 1906–1911). However, more controversial has been Tan's historical conception:

The Chinese territory that existed between the 1750's after the Qing Dynasty had completed its overall unification of China and 1840's before the aggression and encroachment on China by the imperialist powers is the territorial and geographical scope and range of China, a logical and natural formation from the historical process over thousands of years. All the nationalities that existed and operated in history within this scope and range are Chinese nationalities. The regimes they established are part of the historical China.

— Tan Qixiang, "General Compiling Principles", The Historical Atlas of China

This vision has been criticized as anachronistically projecting 20th-century minority policy and border claims into the distant past, resulting in a distorted view of the history of peripheral areas, portraying their incorporation into China as an inevitable organic process, rather than the result of conquest. Similarly, early states are often given overly precise and extensive outer borders, often based on contentious claims. In his afterword to volume 8, written in 1987, Tan identified the Atlas's indiscriminate inclusion of jimi and tusi areas within imperial territory as a flaw. (Note: "唐、宋时代的羁縻州，元、明时代的土司和明代的羁縻卫、所，从有关文献记载看来，既不能说全部都是，也不能说全部都不是唐、宋、元、明王朝的领土。正确处理的方法应该是仔细认真分析史料，适当予以区别。但本图集未能做到这一点，而是采用了完全作为王朝领土处理的办法。有的羁縻地区和王朝的关系可能还赶不上"属国"，却也被画进版图。当然，由于史料不足，要把所有羁縻地区的具体情况全都搞清楚是很困难的，因而不可能要求都区分得很清楚。但是完全不做区别，应该说是一个缺陷。")

== See also ==
- General History of Chinese Administrative Divisions, a 13-volume series envisioned by Tan Qixiang and completed by his students
