= Timeline of the name Palestine =

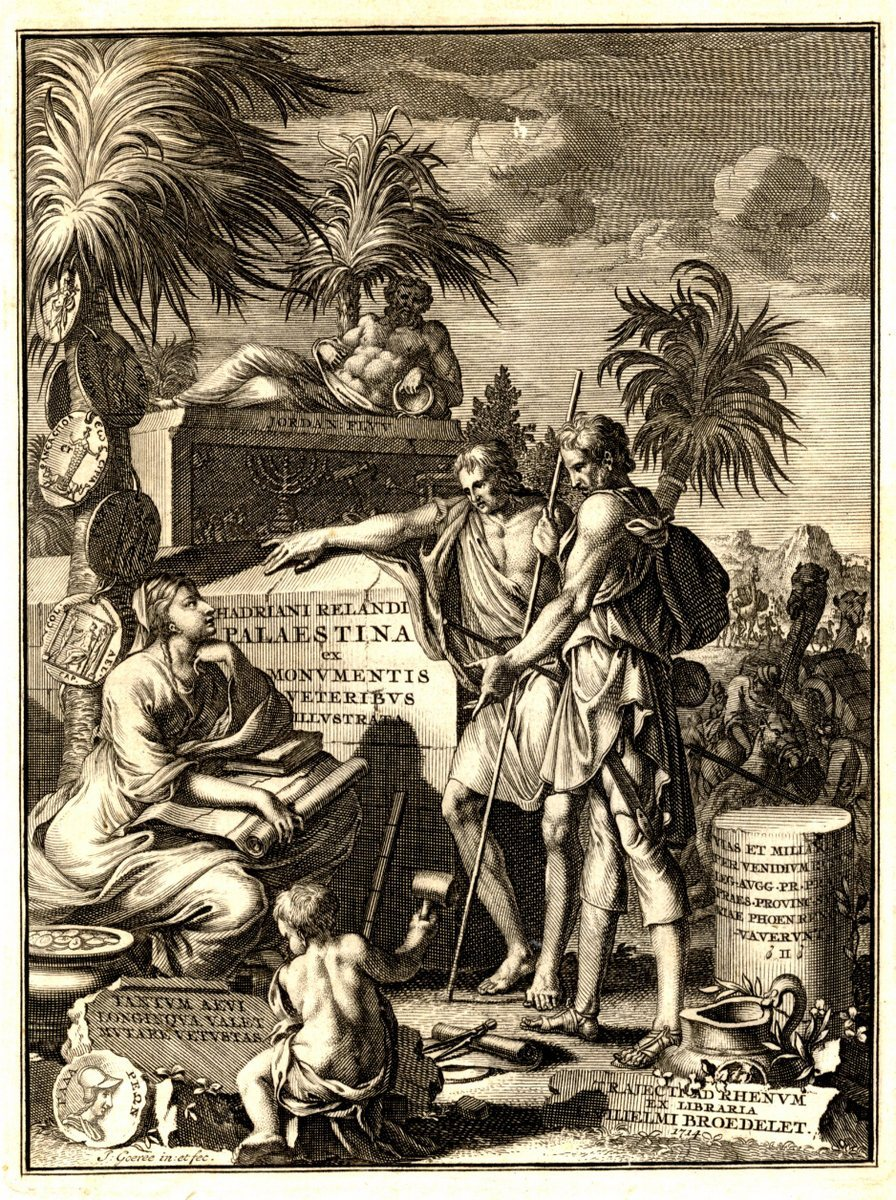
Adriaan Reland's 1712 Palaestina ex Monumentis Veteribus Illustrata (Palestine's Ancient Monuments Illustrated) contains an early description and timeline of the historical references to the name "Palestine."

This article presents a list of notable historical references to the name Palestine as a place name for the region of Palestine throughout history. This includes uses of the localized inflections in various languages, such as Latin Palaestina and Arabic Filasṭīn.

The ancient Greek term that forms the basis for the term Palestine first appears in the 5th century BCE when the historian Herodotus wrote of a "district of Syria, called Palaistinê" between Phoenicia and Egypt in The Histories. Herodotus provides the first historical reference clearly denoting a wide region for Philistia, extending beyond the coast to the inland regions such as the Judean Mountains and the Jordan Rift Valley. Later Greek writers such as Aristotle, Polemon and Pausanias also used the word, which was followed by Roman writers such as Ovid, Tibullus, Pomponius Mela, Pliny the Elder, Dio Chrysostom, Statius, Plutarch as well as Roman Judean writers Philo of Alexandria and Josephus, these examples covering every century from the 4th BCE to the 1st CE. There is, however, no evidence of official use of the name in the Hellenistic period on any coin or inscription, and it is absent from the New Testament.

In the early 2nd century CE, the Roman province called Judaea was renamed Syria Palaestina (Note: †Syria Palaestina) following the suppression of the Bar Kokhba revolt (132–136 CE), the last of the major Jewish–Roman wars. A commonly held yet contested historical interpretation sees the name change as a punitive measure aimed at severing the symbolic and historical connection between the Jewish people and the land. (Note: Men Herodotus in the fifth century BCE mentions Palestine he refers only to the coastal area, so called because it had been inhabited by the Philistines; or he is speaking loosely, since the only part of the area that he had visited was apparently along the coast. ... Moreover, writers on geography in the first century clearly differentiate Judaea from Palestine. Even vicious anti-Jewish writers, such as Apion, Chaeremon, and Seneca in the first century, generally do not use the term Palestine. Palestinian as a noun does not occur in all antiquity. Coins of Hadrian issued before the Bar Kochba rebellion in 132 C.E. refer to Judaea; within a few years after the rebellion the name of Judaea was officially changed to Palestine, the aim being to obliterate the Jewish character of the land, with the name of the nearest tribe being applied to the entire area. Yet, even after the name was officially changed, some inscriptions, as well as such literary figures ... still refer to Judaea.) Other Roman provincial renamings had never followed a rebellion, making this instance unique. Around the year 390, during the Byzantine period, the imperial province of Syria Palaestina was reorganized into Palaestina Prima, Palaestina Secunda and Palaestina Salutaris. Following the Muslim conquest, place names that were in use by the Byzantine administration generally continued to be used in Arabic, and Jund Filastin became one of the military districts within the Umayyad and Abbasid province of Bilad al-Sham.

The use of the name "Palestine" became common in Early Modern English, and was used in English and Arabic during the Mutasarrifate of Jerusalem. The term is recorded widely in print as a self-identification by Palestinians from the start of the 20th century onwards, coinciding with the period when the printing press first came into use by Palestinians. In the 20th century the name was used by the British to refer to "Mandatory Palestine," a territory from the former Ottoman Empire which had been divided in the Sykes–Picot Agreement and secured by Britain via the Mandate for Palestine obtained from the League of Nations. Starting from 2013, the term was officially used in the eponymous "State of Palestine." Both incorporated geographic regions from the land commonly known as Palestine, into states whose territory was named Palestine.

== Etymology ==
The English term "Palestine" itself is borrowed from Latin Palaestīna, which is, in turn, borrowed from Ancient Greek Παλαιστῑ́νη, Palaistī́nē, used by Herodotus in the 5th century BCE. How the term entered the Greek is uncertain, though it is likely to have been by way of an Aramaic loanword.

The term Peleset is found in five inscriptions referring to a neighboring people, starting from c. 1150 BCE during the Twentieth Dynasty of Egypt. The word is transliterated from hieroglyphs as P-r-s-t-w, as Egyptians did not use the consonant "l" in writing, substituting it with "r" instead, and it is generally accepted that this is an ethnonym referring to the Philistines. The earliest of these inscriptions is at the temple of Ramesses in Medinet Habu, which refers to the Peleset among those who fought against Egypt during Ramesses III's reign, and the last known is 300 years later on Padiiset's Statue. The last is the only Egyptian inscription to use Peleset to refer to a region, rather than a people.

The Assyrians used the terms "Palashtu/Palastu" or "Pilistu," beginning in c. 800 BCE with Adad-nirari III in the Nimrud Slab in c. 800 BCE through to an Esarhaddon treaty more than a century later, to refer to the region inhabited by the Philistines. Neither the Egyptian nor the Assyrian sources provided clear regional boundaries for the term.

Whilst the term was used in Egyptian and Assyrian times, prior to the time period in which the Bible is thought to have been written, scholars generally conclude that the term is cognate with the Biblical Hebrew פְּלִשְׁתִּים Pəlīštīm. This Biblical term, commonly translated as Philistines, is ambiguous in its original usage: the 10 uses in the Torah neither define the boundaries of the region, nor provide any meaningful description, and the detailed usage in two later books describing the inhabitants of five coastal cities has been interpreted to mean "non-Israelites of the Promised Land", due to the Septuagint’s consistent replacement of Pəlīštīm with allophuloi (Αλλόφυλοι, 'other nations').

== Historical references ==
=== Ancient period ===
==== Egyptian period ====
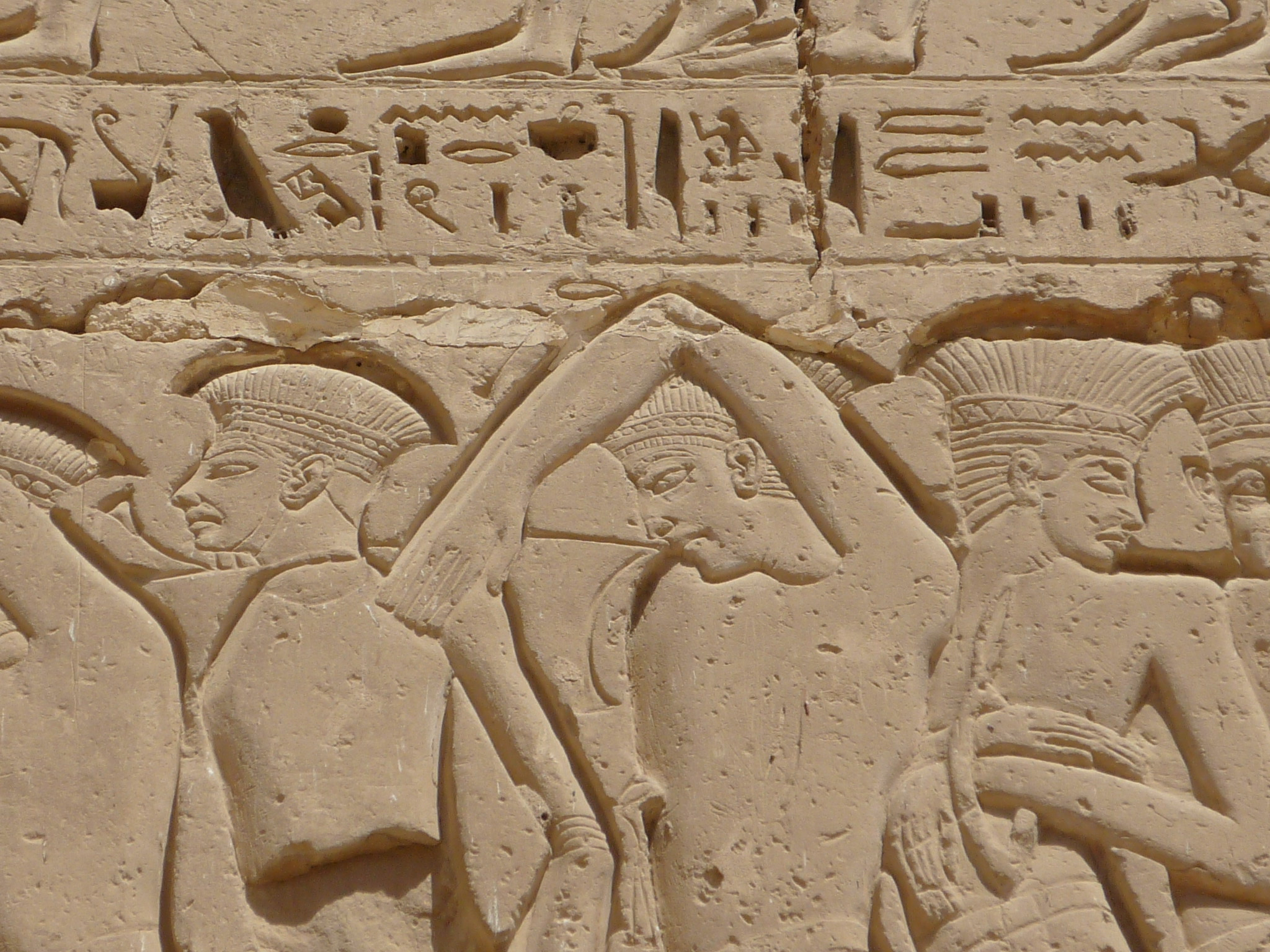
"Peleset" captives (bas-relief, Medinet Habu, c. 1150 BCE under Ramses III).

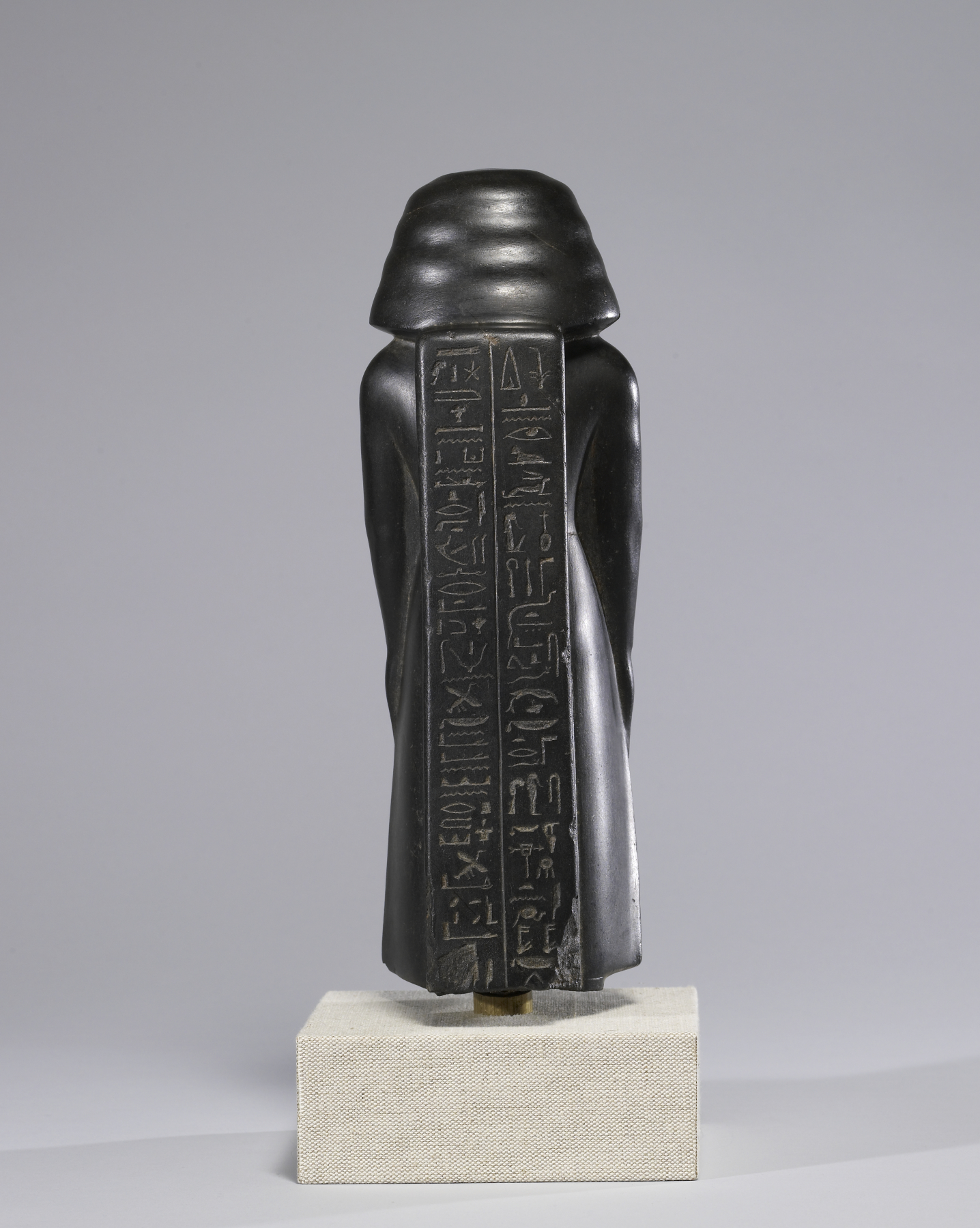
Padiiset's Statue "the impartial envoy to Canaan and Peleset"

- c. 1150 BCE: Medinet Habu: records a people called the P-r-s-t (conventionally Peleset) among those who fought against Egypt in Ramesses III's reign.
- c. 1150 BCE: Papyrus Harris I: "I extended all the boundaries of Egypt; I overthrew those who invaded them from their lands. I slew the Denyen in their isles, the Thekel and the Peleset (Pw-r-s-ty) were made ashes."
- c. 1150 BCE: Rhetorical Stela to Ramesses III, Chapel C, Deir el-Medina.
- c. 1000 BCE: Onomasticon of Amenope: "Sherden, Tjekker, Peleset, Khurma."
- c. 900 BCE: Padiiset's Statue, inscription: "envoy – Canaan – Peleset."

==== Assyrian period ====
- c. 800 BCE: Adad-nirari III, Nimrud Slab.
- c. 800 BCE: Adad-nirari III, Saba'a Stele: "In the fifth year (of my official rule) I sat down solemnly on my royal throne and called up the country (for war). I ordered the numerous army of Assyria to march against Philistia (Pa-la-áš-tu)... I received all the tributes [...] which they brought to Assyria. I (then) ordered [to march] against the country Damascus (Ša-imērišu)."
- c. 735 BCE: Qurdi-Ashur-lamur to Tiglath-Pileser III, Nimrud Letter ND 2715: "Bring down lumber, do your work on it, (but) do not deliver it to the Egyptians (mu-sur-a-a) or Philistines (pa-la-as-ta-a-a), or I shall not let you go up to the mountains."
- c. 717 BCE: Sargon II's Prism A: records the region as Palashtu or Pilistu.
- c. 700 BCE: Azekah Inscription records the region as Pi-lis-ta-a-a.
- c. 694 BCE: Sennacherib "Palace Without a Rival: A Very Full Record of Improvements in and about the Capital (E1)": (the people of) Kue and Hilakku, Pilisti and Surri ("Ku-e u Hi-lak-ku Pi-lis-tu u Sur-ri").
- c. 675 BCE: Esarhaddon's Treaty with Ba'al of Tyre: Refers to the entire district of Pilistu (^{KUR}pi-lis-te).

=== Classical antiquity ===
==== Persian (Achaemenid) Empire period ====
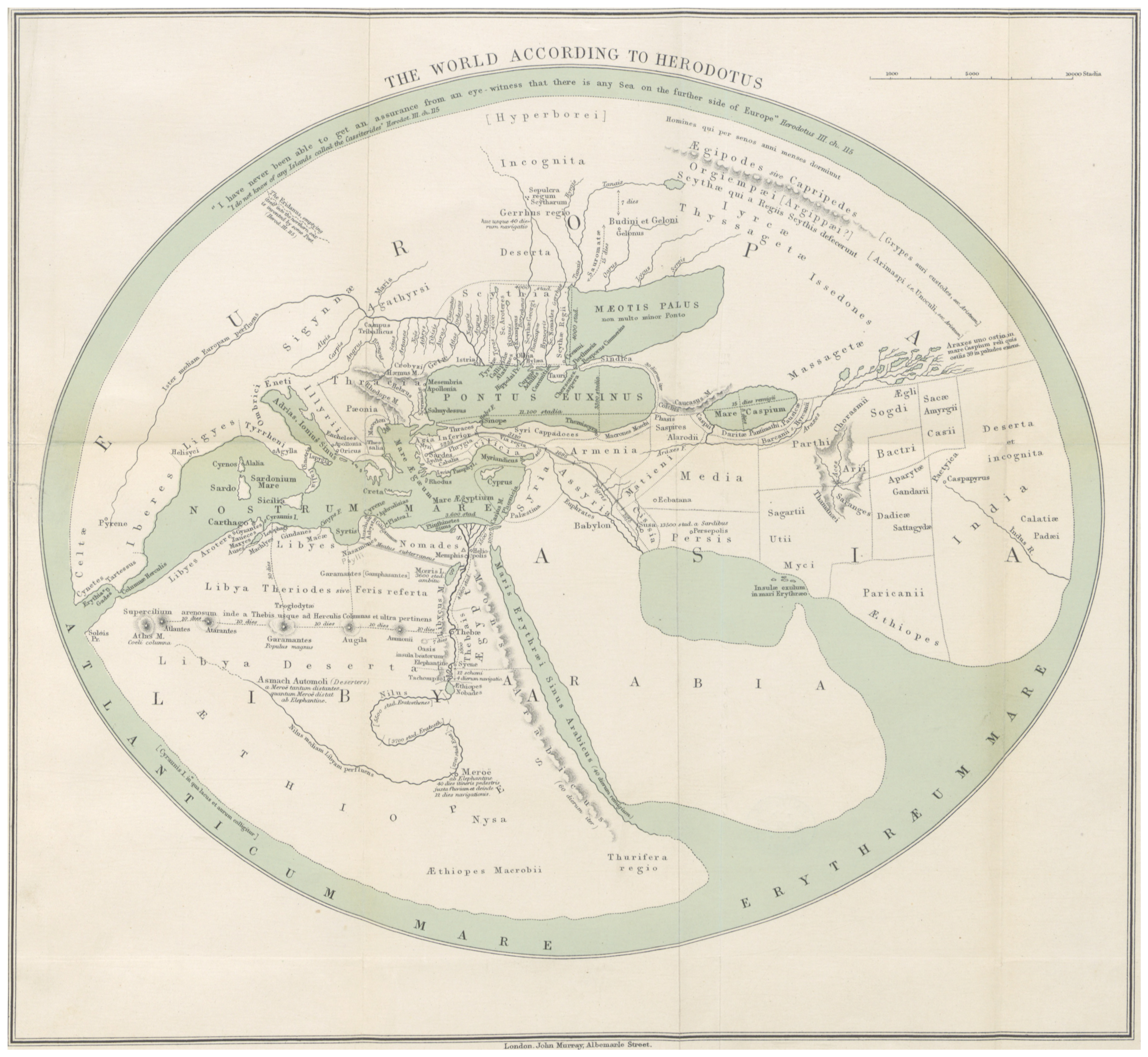
Palestine c.450 BCE according to Herodotus (1897 reconstruction)

- c. 450 BCE: Herodotus, The Histories, First historical reference clearly denoting a wider region than biblical Philistia, referring to a "district of Syria, called Palaistinê" (Book 3): "The country reaching from the city of Posideium to the borders of Egypt... paid a tribute of three hundred and fifty talents. All Phoenicia, Palestine Syria, and Cyprus, were herein contained. This was the fifth satrapy."; (Note: †Achaemenid Empire) (Book 4): "the region I am describing skirts our sea, stretching from Phoenicia along the coast of Palestine-Syria till it comes to Egypt, where it terminates"; (Book 7): "[The Phoenicians and the Syrians of Palestine], according to their own account, dwelt anciently upon the Erythraean Sea, but crossing thence, fixed themselves on the seacoast of Syria, where they still inhabit. This part of Syria, and all the region extending from hence to Egypt, is known by the name of Palestine." One important reference refers to the practice of male circumcision associated with the Hebrew people: "the Colchians, the Egyptians, and the Ethiopians, are the only nations who have practised circumcision from the earliest times. The Phoenicians and the Syrians of Palestine themselves confess that they learnt the custom of the Egyptians.... Now these are the only nations who use circumcision."
- c. 340 BCE: Aristotle, Meteorology, "Again if, as is fabled, there is a lake in Palestine, such that if you bind a man or beast and throw it in it floats and does not sink, this would bear out what we have said. They say that this lake is so bitter and salt that no fish live in it and that if you soak clothes in it and shake them it cleans them." This is understood by scholars to be a reference to the Dead Sea.

==== Hellenic kingdoms (Ptolemaic/Seleucid/Hasmonean) period ====
- c. 2nd century BCE: Inscription on marble in Delos: "To Zeus Ourios, to Astarte Palaistine Aphrodite Ourania, gods who listen, Damon, son of Demetrios, of the city Ascalon, having been saved from pirates, (consecrated the altar as a result of his) fulfilled vow."
- c. 150 BCE: Polemon of Athens, Greek Histories, quoted by Eusebius of Caesarea in Praeparatio Evangelica: "In the time [reign] of Apis son of Phoroneus a part of the Egyptian army was expelled from Egypt, who took up their abode not far from Arabia in the part of Syria called Palestine."
- c. 130 BCE: Agatharchides (5.87, quoted in Diodorus Siculus's Bibliotheca historica; Strabo's Geographica, and Photios' Bibliotheca): "Near (Tiran) island is a promontory, which stretches towards the Rock of the Nabataeans and Palestine."

==== Roman Jerusalem period ====
Palestine in c. 43 CE according to Pomponius Mela (map as reconstructed by K. Miller, 1898)

Writers during this period also used the term Palestine to refer to the entire region between Syria and Egypt, with numerous references to the Jewish areas within Palestine. It has been contended that some first century authors associated the term with the southern coastal region.

- c. 30 BCE: Tibullus, Tibullus and Sulpicia: The Poems: "Why tell how the white dove sacred to the Syrians flies unharmed through the crowded cities of Palestine?"
- c. 2 CE: Ovid, Ars Amatoria: "the seventh-day feast that the Syrian of Palestine observes."
- c. 8 CE: Ovid, Metamorphoses: (1) "...Dercetis of Babylon, who, as the Palestinians believe, changed to a fish, all covered with scales, and swims in a pool" and (2) "There fell also Mendesian Celadon; Astreus, too, whose mother was a Palestinian, and his father unknown."
- c. 17 CE: Ovid, Fasti (poem): "When Jupiter took up arms to defend the heavens, came to Euphrates with the little Cupid, and sat by the brink of the waters of Palestine."
- c. 40 CE: Philo of Alexandria, (1) Every Good Man is Free: "Moreover Palestine and Syria too are not barren of exemplary wisdom and virtue, which countries no slight portion of that most populous nation of the Jews inhabits. There is a portion of those people called Essenes."; (2) On the Life of Moses: "[Moses] conducted his people as a colony into Phoenicia, and into the Coele-Syria, and Palestine, which was at that time called the land of the Canaanites, the borders of which country were three days' journey distant from Egypt."; (3) On Abraham: "The country of the Sodomites was a district of the land of Canaan, which the Syrians afterwards called Palestine."
- c. 43 CE: Pomponius Mela, De situ orbis (Description of the World): "Syria holds a broad expanse of the littoral, as well as lands that extend rather broadly into the interior, and it is designated by different names in different places. For example, it is called Coele, Mesopotamia, Judaea, Commagene, and Sophene. It is Palestine at the point where Syria abuts the Arabs, then Phoenicia, and then—where it reaches Cilicia—Antiochia. [...] In Palestine, however, is Gaza, a mighty and well fortified city."
- c. 78: Pliny the Elder, Natural History, Volume 1, Book V: Chapter 13: "Next to these countries Syria occupies the coast, once the greatest of lands, and distinguished by many names; for the part which joins up to Arabia was formerly called Palaestina, Judaea, Coele, (Note: †Coele-Syria) and Phoenice. The country in the interior was called Damascena, and that further on and more to the south, Babylonia."; Chapter 14: "After this, at the point where the Serbonian Bog becomes visible, Idumea and Palaestina begin. This lake, which some writers have made to be 150 miles in circumference, Herodotus has placed at the foot of Mount Casius; it is now an inconsiderable fen. The towns are Rhinocorura and, in the interior, Rafah, Gaza, and, still more inland, Anthedon: there is also Mount Argaris"; Book XII, Chapter 40: "For these branches of commerce, they have opened the city of Carræ, which serves as an entrepot, and from which place they were formerly in the habit of proceeding to Gabba, at a distance of twenty days' journey, and thence to Palæstina, in Syria."
- c. 80: Marcus Valerius Probus, Commentary on Georgics: "Edomite palms from Idumea, that is Judea, which is in the region of Syria Palestine."
- c. 85: Silius Italicus, Punica: "While yet a youth, he [Titus] shall put an end to war with the fierce people of Palestine."
- c. 90: Dio Chrysostom, quoted by Synesius, refers to the Dead Sea as being in the interior of Palestine, in the very vicinity of "Sodoma."
- c. 94: Josephus, Antiquities of the Jews: "...these Antiquities contain what hath been delivered down to us from the original creation of man, until the twelfth year of the reign of Nero, as to what hath befallen us Jews, as well is Egypt as in Syria, and in Palestine."
- c. 94: Josephus, Antiquities of the Jews: "...the children of Mesraim, being eight in number, possessed the country from Gaza to Egypt, though it retained the name of one only, the Philistim; for the Greeks call part of that country Palestine."
- c. 94: Josephus, Antiquities of the Jews: "... Aram had the Aramites, which the Greeks called Syrians; as Laud founded the Laudites, which are now called Lydians. Of the four sons of Aram, Uz founded Trachonitis and Damascus: this country lies between Palestine and Coelesyria."
- c. 97: Josephus, Against Apion: "Nor, indeed, was Herodotus of Halicarnassus unacquainted with our nation, but mentions it after a way of his own... This, therefore, is what Herodotus says, that "the Syrians that are in Palestine are circumcised." But there are no inhabitants of Palestine that are circumcised excepting the Jews; and, therefore, it must be his knowledge of them that enabled him to speak so much concerning them."
- c. 100: Statius, Silvae, refers to "liquores Palestini" and "Isis, ...gently with thine own hand lead the peerless youth, on whom the Latian prince hath bestowed the standards of the East and the bridling of the cohorts of Palestine, (i.e., a command on the Syrian front) through festal gate and sacred haven and the cities of thy land."
- c. 100: Plutarch, Parallel Lives: "Armenia, where Tigranes reigns, king of kings, and holds in his hands a power that has enabled him to keep the Parthians in narrow bounds, to remove Greek cities bodily into Media, to conquer Syria and Palestine, to put to death the kings of the royal line of Seleucus, and carry away their wives and daughters by violence." and "The triumph [of Pompey] was so great, that though it was divided into two days, the time was far from being sufficient for displaying what was prepared to be carried in procession; there remained still enough to adorn another triumph. At the head of the show appeared the titles of the conquered nations; Pontus Armenia, Cappadocia, Paphlagonia, Media, Colchis, the Iberians, the Albanians, Syria, Cilicia, Mesopotamia, Phoenicia, Palestine, Judea, Arabia, the pirates subdued both by sea and land."
- c. 100: Achilles Tatius, Leucippe and Cleitophon and other love stories in eight books: "Your father did not return from his absence in Palestine until two days later; and he then found a letter had arrived from Leucippe's father—it had come the very day after our flight—betrothing his daughter to you."

==== Roman Aelia Capitolina period ====
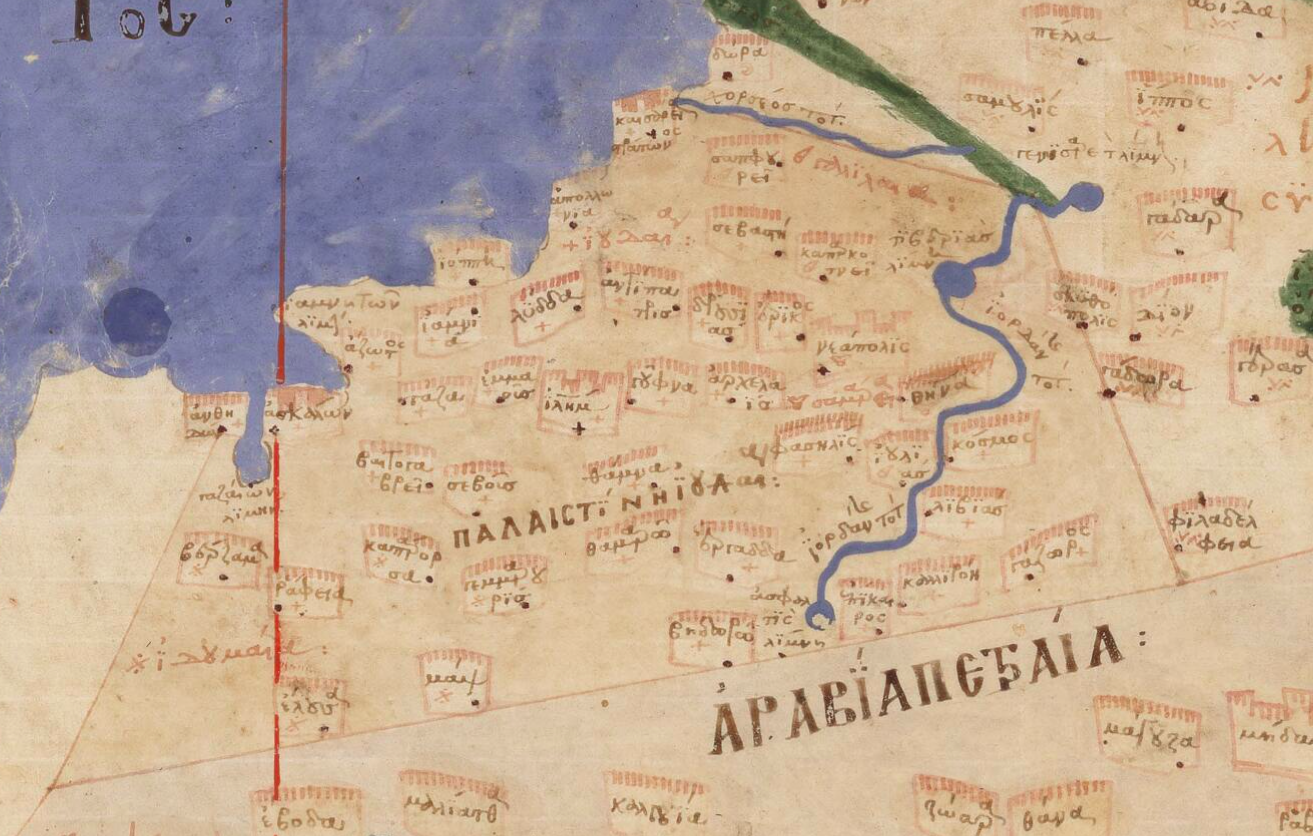
This image shows the oldest surviving copy of the oldest known map of the region of Palestine/Israel. It is from Ptolemy's 4th Asia map, and was a revision of a now-lost atlas by Marinus of Tyre (note the proximity of Tyre to Palestine). The large red letters in the center say in Greek: Παλαιστινης or Palaistinis.

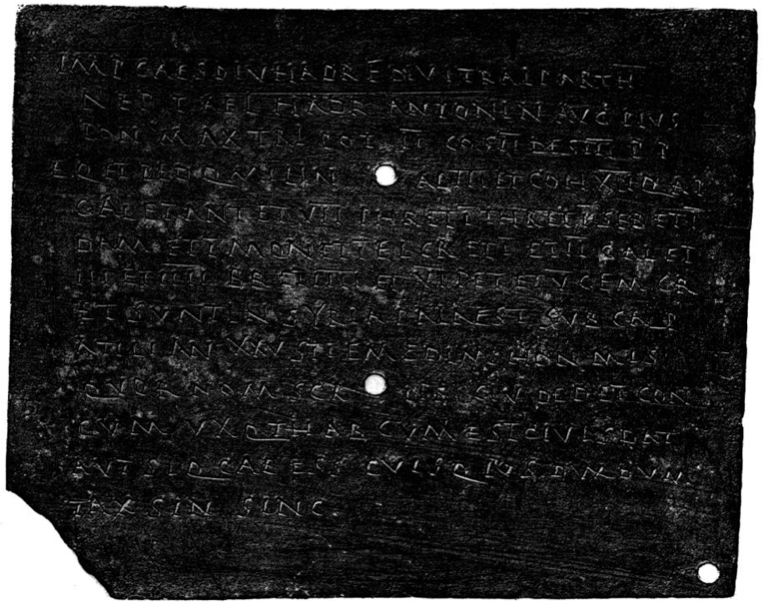
"Syria Palaestin[a]" mentioned in a 139 CE Roman military diploma

- Syria Palaestina (also spelled with æ, Palæstina) (c. 135–c. 390 CE) was a Roman province established following the suppression of the Bar Kokhba revolt (132–136 CE). According to the prevailing scholarly view, it was created through the renaming of the province of Judaea as a punitive measure against the Jewish population, who had led the failed uprising. The former name, Judaea, carried a clear ethnic association with the Jewish people, whereas the new designation, Syria Palaestina, was devoid of explicit ethnic connotations. Although the Roman Empire often renamed provinces, this instance is unique as the only known case in which a provincial name was changed in response to a rebellion. The precise date and motivations behind the name change remain uncertain, though circumstantial evidence points to Emperor Hadrian's involvement. Coins issued by Hadrian before the revolt still refer to Judaea, while a military diploma from 139 CE already uses the name Syria Palaestina. A widely held interpretation suggests that the renaming was intended to sever the historical and symbolic connection of the Jewish people to their ancestral homeland. Seth Schwartz interprets the change as intended to "celebrate the de-Judaization" of the province. David Jacobson contends that Hadrian's choice of Syria Palaestina was a rational administrative decision, reflecting the territorial scope of the province beyond Judea proper. He also notes that the name had ancient precedents and was historically linked to the broader region of greater Israel. Louis Feldman writes that the aim was to "obliterate the Jewish character of the land, with the name of the nearest tribe being applied to the entire area", adding that the term Palestina had previously referred primarily to the coastal region associated with the Philistines and that early Roman authors typically distinguished it from Judaea. Werner Eck writes that the renaming was a unique and deliberate punishment aimed at erasing the province's Jewish identity after the Bar Kokhba revolt. He rejects demographic explanations, citing provinces like Pannonia that retained their names despite population loss, and emphasizes that Judaea was the only province in Roman history renamed directly as a result of rebellion, uniquely severing the link between the province's name and its people.
- 139: A Roman military diploma from Afiq names military units "in Syria Palaestin[a]."
- c. 130: Pausanias (geographer), and (3) "[a Hebrew Sibyl] brought up in Palestine named Sabbe, whose father was Berosus and her mother Erymanthe. Some say she was a Babylonian, while others call her an Egyptian Sibyl."
- c. 150: Aelius Aristides, To Plato: In Defense of the Four: (671) These men alone should be classed neither among flatterers nor free men. For they deceive like flatterers, but they are insolent as if they were of higher rank, since they are involved in the two most extreme and opposite evils, baseness and willfulness, behaving like those impious men of Palestine. For the proof of the impiety of those people is that they do not believe in the higher powers. And these men in a certain fashion have defected from the Greek race, or rather from all that is higher.
- c. 150: Appian, Roman History: "Intending to write the history of the Romans, I have deemed it necessary to begin with the boundaries of the nations under their sway.... Here turning our course and passing round, we take in Palestine-Syria, and beyond it a part of Arabia. The Phoenicians hold the country next to Palestine on the sea, and beyond the Phoenician territory are Coele-Syria, and the parts stretching from the sea as far inland as the river Euphrates, namely Palmyra and the sandy country round about, extending even to the Euphrates itself."
- c. 150: Lucian of Samosata, Passing of Peregrinus: 11. "It was then that he learned the wondrous lore of the Christians, by associating with their priests and scribes in Palestine. And—how else could it be?—in a trice he made them all look like children, for he was prophet, cult-leader, head of the synagogue, and everything, all by himself. He interpreted and explained some of their books and even composed many, and they revered him as a god, made use of him as a lawgiver, and set him down as a protector, next after that other, to be sure, whom they still worship, the man who was crucified in Palestine because he introduced this new cult into the world.
- c. 150: Arrian, Anabasis Alexandri: "Tyre then was captured, in the archonship at Athens of Anicetus in the month I lecatombacun...Alexander now determined to make his expedition to Egypt. The rest of Syrian Palestine (as it is called) had already come over to him, but a certain eunuch, Batis, who was master of Gaza, did not join Alexander."
- c. 150: Ptolemy, Geography (Ptolemy), including map.
- 155: First Apology of Justin Martyr, refers to "Flavia Neapolis in Palestine" in the introductory paragraph.
- 159: Coins from the Neapolis mint from the time of Antoninus Pius: Flavia Neapolis (?), in Syria, in Palestine, year 88 (in Greek).
- 159-160 Coin from the Neapolis mint from the time of Faustina II: FL NEAC POLEWC CYRIAC PALECTI ("Flavia Neapolis Syria Palestine")
- c. 200: Ulpian, On Taxes: Book I. It should be remembered that there are certain coloniae subject to the Italian Law. ...The colony of Ptolemais, which is situated between Phoenicia and Palestine, has nothing but the name of a colony. ...In Palestine there are two colonies, those of Caesarea and Aelia Capitolina; but neither of these enjoy Italian privileges.
- c. 200: Tertullian, The Works of Tertullian: Palestine had not yet received from Egypt its Jewish swarm (of emigrants), nor had the race from which Christians sprung yet settled down there, when its neighbors Sodom and Gomorrah were consumed by fire from heaven.
- c. 200: Sextus Julius Africanus, Epistle to Aristides: Some Idumean robbers attacking Ascalon, a city of Palestine, besides other spoils which they took from a temple of Apollo, which was built near the walls, carried off captive one Antipater, son of a certain Herod, a servant of the temple. And as the priest was not able to pay the ransom for his son, Antipater was brought up in the customs of the Idumeans, and afterwards enjoyed the friendship of Hyrcanus, the high priest of Judea. And being sent on an embassy to Pompey on behalf of Hyrcanus, and having restored to him the kingdom which was being wasted by Aristobulus his brother, he was so fortunate as to obtain the title of procurator of Palestine.
- c. 225: Cassius Dio, Historia Romana: The Eastern Wars c. 70 BCE "This was the course of events at that time in Palestine; for this is the name that has been given from of old to the whole country extending from Phoenicia to Egypt along the inner sea. They have also another name that they have acquired: the country has been named Judaea, and the people themselves Jews." [...] The Destruction of Jerusalem by Titus in 70 CE "Such was the course of these events; and following them Vespasian was declared emperor by the senate also, and Titus and Domitian were given the title of Caesars. The consular office was assumed by Vespasian and Titus while the former was in Egypt and the latter in Palestine."
- c. 300: Flavius Vopiscus, Augustan History: On the lives of Firmus, Saturninus, Proculus and Bonosus: "So then, holding such an opinion about the Egyptians Aurelian forbade Saturninus to visit Egypt, showing a wisdom that was truly divine. For as soon as the Egyptians saw that one of high rank had arrived among them, they straightway shouted aloud, "Saturninus Augustus, may the gods keep you!" But he, like a prudent man, as one cannot deny, fled at once from the city of Alexandria and returned to Palestine." On the Life of Septimius Severus: "And not long afterwards he [Severus] met with Niger near Cyzicus, slew him, and paraded his head on a pike. ...The citizens of Neapolis in Palestine, because they had long been in arms on Niger's side, he deprived of all their civic rights, and to many individuals, other than members of the senatorial order, who had followed Niger he meted out cruel punishments." On the life of Aurelian: "Aurelian, now ruler over the entire world, having subdued both the East and the Gauls, and victor in all lands, turned his march toward Rome, that he might present to the gaze of the Romans a triumph. ...There were three royal chariots, ...twenty elephants, and two hundred tamed beasts of diverse kinds from Libya and Palestine."
- c. 300: Antonine Itinerary.
- c. 311: Bishop Eusebius of Caesarea, Onomasticon: "Philistines (Gen. 21:34). Now called Askalon, the well-known country of Palestine is round about it." See also Eusebius, History of the Martyrs in Palestine. As the "Father of Church History," Eusebius' use of the name Palestine influenced later generations of Christian writers.

=== Late Antiquity period ===
==== Late Roman Empire (Byzantine) period ====
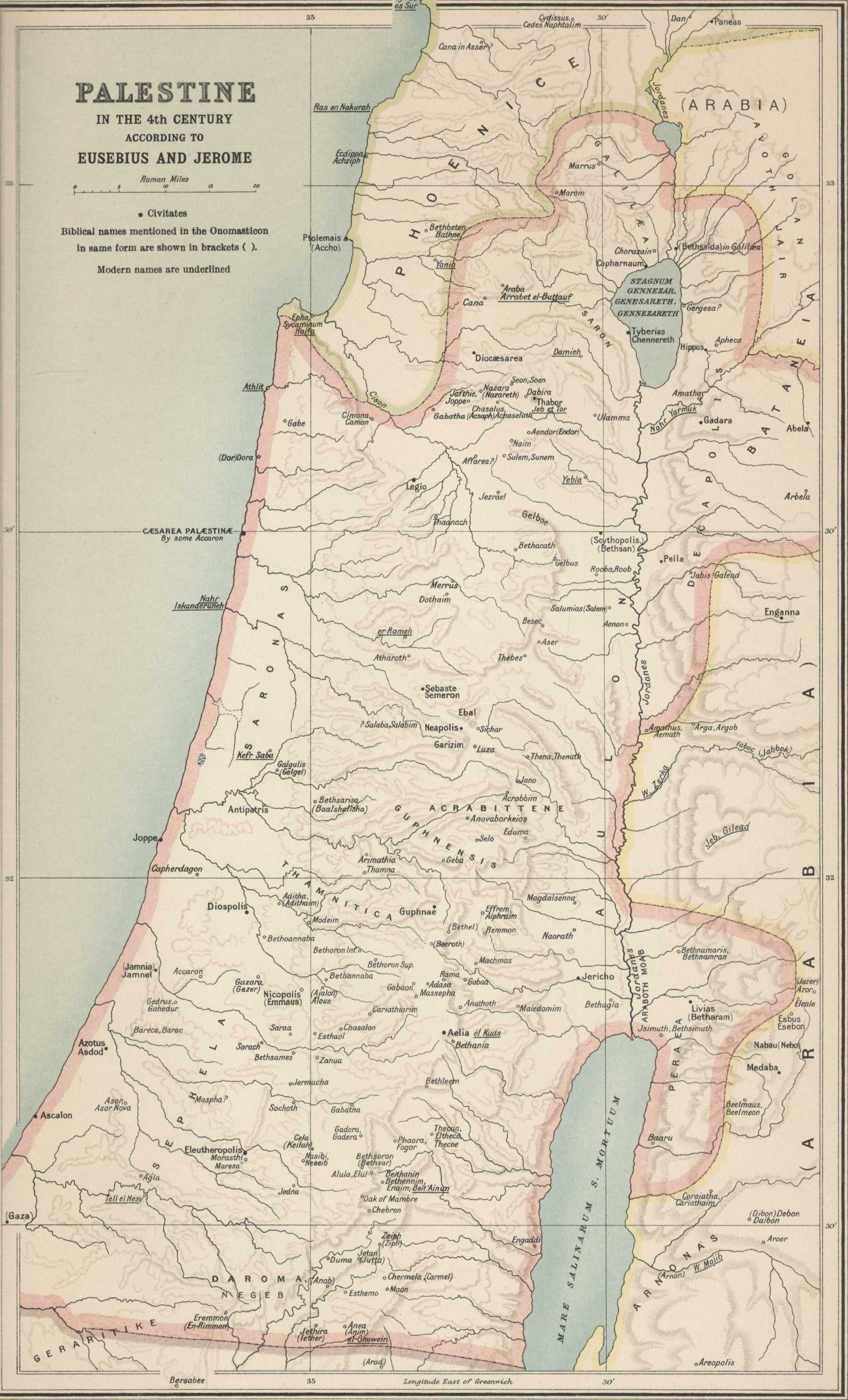
Palestine in c. 350 CE according to Eusbius and Jerome (map as reconstructed by George Adam Smith, 1915)

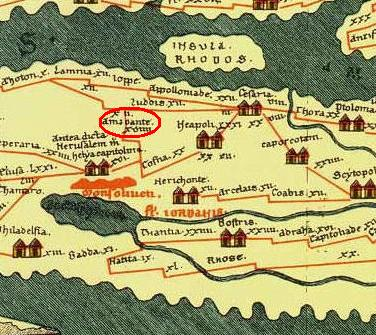
Tabula Peutingeriana of c. 400 CE showing a section of Palestine (Copy by Conradi Milleri 1888)

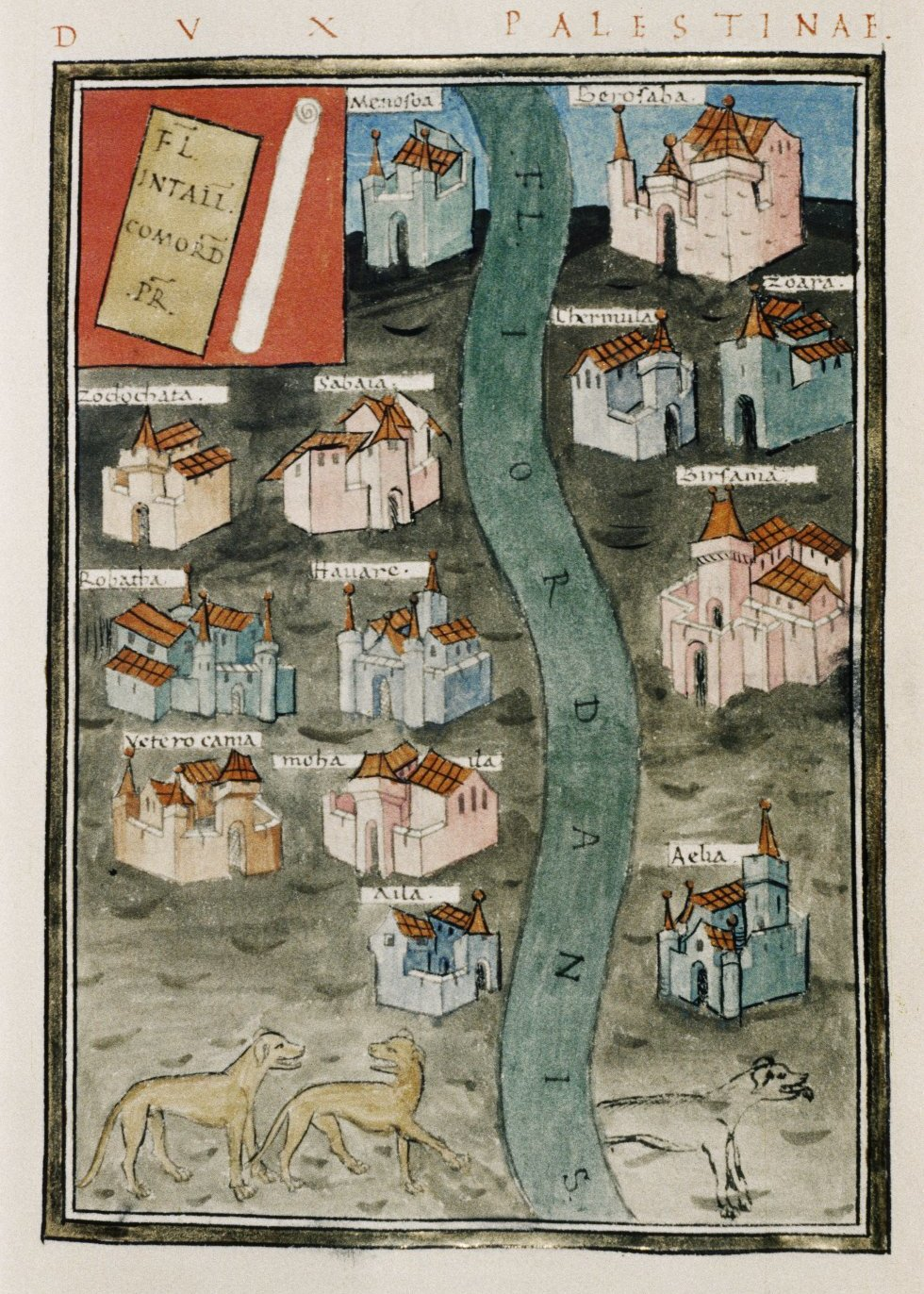
Notitia Dignitatum of c. 410 CE showing Dux Palestinae

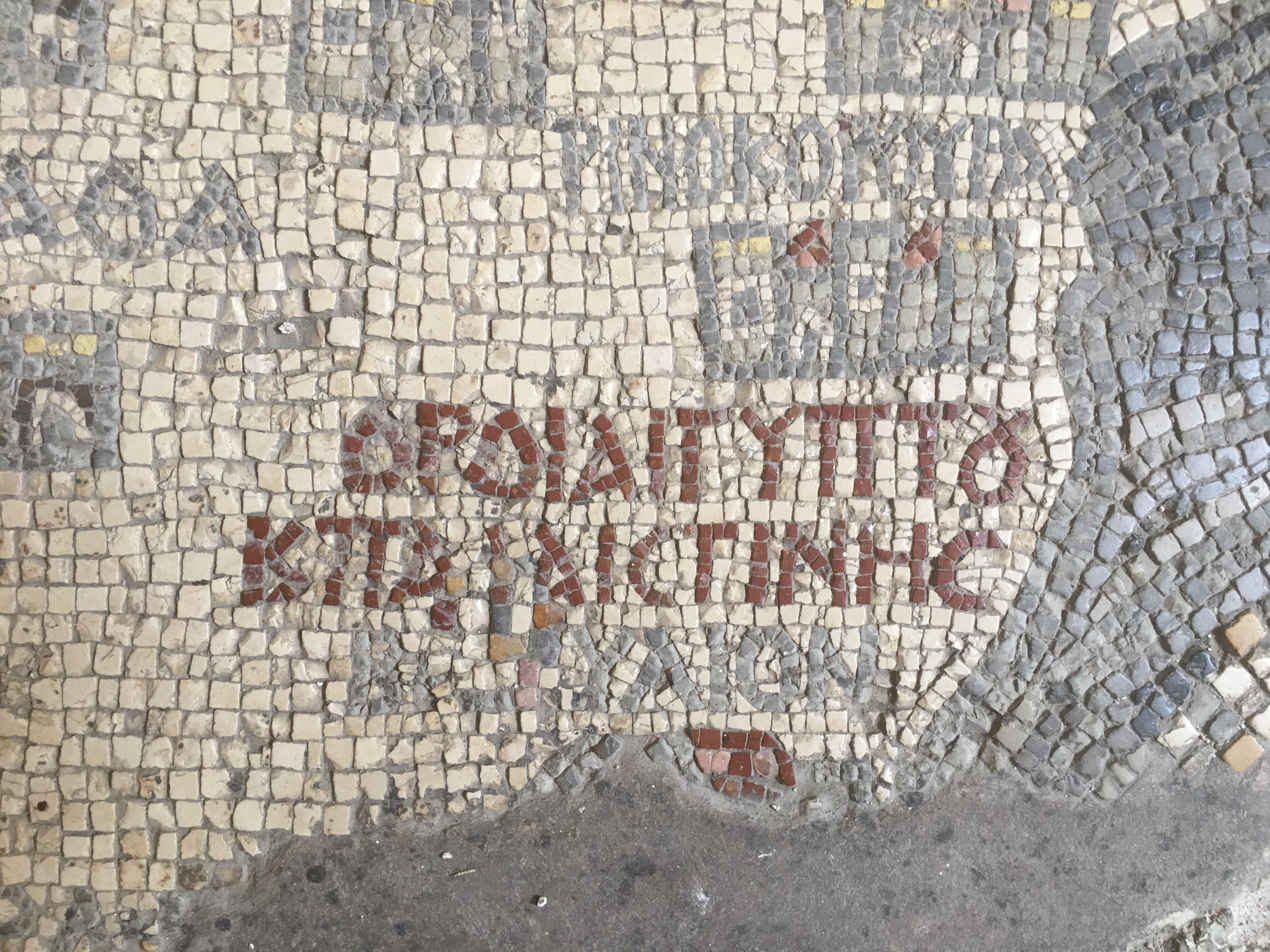
Madaba map extract showing "οροι Αιγυπτου και Παλαιστινης" (the "border of Egypt and Palestine)

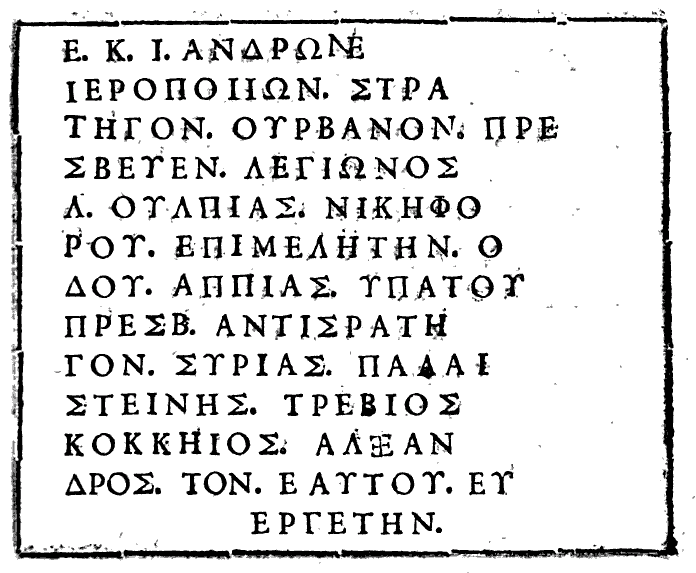
Undated Classical inscription from Constantinople, published by George Dousa in 1599, mentioning "Syriae Palaisteinae"

- c. 362: Julian, Against the Galileans: "Why were you so ungrateful to our gods as to desert them for the Jews?" Was it because the gods granted the sovereign power to Rome, permitting the Jews to be free for a short time only, and then forever to be enslaved and aliens? Look at Abraham: was he not an alien in a strange land? And Jacob: was he not a slave, first in Syria, then after that in Palestine, and in his old age in Egypt? Does not Moses say that he led them forth from the house of bondage out of Egypt "with a stretched out arm"? And after their sojourn in Palestine did they not change their fortunes more frequently than observers say the chameleon changes its colour, now subject to the judges, now enslaved to foreign races?
- c. 365: Aurelius Victor, Epitome de Caesaribus: Vespasian ruled ten years. [...] Volgeses, King of Parthia, was compelled to peace. The Syria for which Palestina is the name, and Cilicia, and Trachia and Commagene, which today we call Augustophratensis, were added to the provinces. Judaea, too, was added.
- c. 370: Eutropius, Breviarium historiae Romanae: "Vespasian, who had been chosen emperor in Palestine, a prince indeed of obscure birth, but worthy to be compared with the best emperors." and "Under him Judæa was added to the Roman Empire; and Jerusalem, which was a very famous city of Palestine."
- 375: Epiphanius of Salamis (born in Palestine), Panarion 4.3: "So Abraham’s own children in succession—I mean beginning with himself, and Isaac and Jacob next, and Jacob’s children after him—continued to be circumcised and adhere to the true religion in the land of Canaan (called Judaea and Philistia then, though its name is now Palestine) and in Egypt as well."
- c. 380: Ammianus Marcellinus, "Book XIV," The Roman History of Ammianus Marcellinus: Book XIV, 8, 11. "The last province of the Syrias is Palestine, a district of great extent, abounding in well-cultivated and beautiful land, and having several magnificent cities, all of equal importance, and rivalling one another as it were, in parallel lines. For instance, Caesarea, which Herod built in honour of the Prince Octavianus, and Eleutheropolis, and Neapolis, and also Ascalon, and Gaza, cities built in bygone ages."
- c. 384: Saint Jerome, Epistle 33: "He (Origen) stands condemned by his bishop, Demetrius, only the bishops of Palestine, Arabia, Phenicia, and Achaia dissenting."
- c. 385: Egeria, Itinerary: "The greatest part of Palestine, the land of promise, was in sight, together with the whole land of Jordan, as far as it could be seen with our eyes."
- 386: Paula of Rome and Eustochium, The Letter of Paula and Eustochium to Marcella, About the Holy Places: "Oh, when will that time come when a breathless messenger shall bring us the news that our Marcella has reached the shore of Palestine, and all the choirs of monks, all the troops of nuns shall shout applause?"
- 390: Auxentius of Durostorum (else Maximinus the Arian), Commenttarium on Iob: "In regione Arabiae et Palaestinorum asini, qui veloces sunt similiter ut equi."
- c. 390: John Chrysostom, On Wealth and Poverty: ""What about Abraham?" someone says. Who has suffered as many misfortunes as he? Was he not exiled from his country? Was he not separated from all his household? Did he not endure hunger in a foreign land? Did he not, like a wanderer, move continually, from Babylon to Mesopotamia, from there to Palestine, and from there to Egypt?" and Adversus Judaeos: "VI...[7] Do you not see that their Passover is the type, while our Pasch is the truth? Look at the tremendous difference between them. The Passover prevented bodily death: whereas the Pasch quelled God's anger against the whole world; the Passover of old freed the Jews from Egypt, while the Pasch has set us free from idolatry; the Passover drowned the Pharaoh, but the Pasch drowned the devil; after the Passover came Palestine, but after the Pasch will come heaven."
- c. 390: Palaestina was organised into three administrative units: Palaestina Prima, Secunda, and Tertia (First, Second, and Third Palestine), part of the Diocese of the East. Palaestina Prima consisted of Judea, Samaria, the Paralia, and Peraea with the governor residing in Caesarea. Palaestina Secunda consisted of the Galilee, the lower Jezreel Valley, the regions east of Galilee, and the western part of the former Decapolis with the seat of government at Scythopolis. Palaestina Tertia included the Negev, southern Jordan—once part of Arabia—and most of Sinai with Petra as the usual residence of the governor. Palestina Tertia was also known as Palaestina Salutaris. Recorded in the:
  - Codex Theodosianus, published in 438, and containing previous laws, including a first mention in 409.
  - Synecdemus of Hierocles (c. 530)
  - Descriptio Orbis Romani of George of Cyprus (c. 600)
- 392: Epiphanius of Salamis (born in Palestine), On Weights and Measures: "So [Hadrian] passed through the city of Antioch and passed through [Coele-Syria] and Phoenicia and came to Palestine — which is also called Judea — forty-seven years after the destruction of Jerusalem."
- c. 400: Genesis Rabba (90.6), Jewish midrash, proposes that the word "land" in Genesis 41:54 refers to three lands in the region – Phoenicia, Arabia and Palestine.(ויהי רעב בכל הארצות: בשלש ארצות בפנקיא ובערביא ובפלסטיני)
- c. 400: Lamentations Rabbah (1.5), Jewish midrash, proposes that the dukes of Arabia, Africa, Alexandria, and Palestine, had joined forces with Roman Emperor Vespasian. (שלש שנים ומחצה הקיף אספסיאנוס את ירושלם והיו עמו ארבעה דוכסין, דוכס דערביא, דוכס דאפריקא, דוכוס דאלכסנדריא, דוכוס דפלסטיני)
- c. 400: Leviticus Rabbah (parasha 5, verse 3) proposes Gath of the Philistines is the same as the "(hills or forts) of Palestine" (תלוליא דפלסטיני).
- c. 400: Cursus publicus, Tabula Peutingeriana: map: Roman road network, map index.
- c. 411: Jerome, Hieronymus on Ezekiel: "iuda et terra Israel ipsi institores tui in frumento primo; balsamum et mel et oleum et resinam proposuerunt in nundinis tuis. (lxx: iudas et filii Israel isti negotiatores tui in frumenti commercio et unguentis; primum mel et oleum et resinam dederunt in nundinis tuis). uerbum hebraicum 'phanag' aquila, symmachus et theodotio ita ut apud hebraeos positum est transtulerunt, pro quo septuaginta 'unguenta,' nos 'balsamum' uertimus. dicitur autem quibus terra iudaea, quae nunc appellatur palaestina, abundet copiis frumento, balsamo, melle et oleo et resina, quae an iuda et Israel ad tyri nundinas deferuntur."
- c. 414: Jerome, Letter 129: Ad Dardanum de Terra promissionis: "You may delineate the Promised Land of Moses from the Book of Numbers (ch. 34): as bounded on the south by the desert tract called Sina, between the Dead Sea and the city of Kadesh-barnea, [which is located with the Arabah to the east] and continues to the west, as far as the river of Egypt, that discharges into the open sea near the city of Rhinocolara; as bounded on the west by the sea along the coasts of Palestine, Phoenicia, Coele‑Syria, and Cilicia; as bounded on the north by the circle formed by the Taurus Mountains and Zephyrium and extending to Hamath, called Epiphany‑Syria; as bounded on the east by the city of Antioch Hippos and Lake Kinneret, now called Tiberias, and then the Jordan River which discharges into the salt sea, now called the Dead Sea."
- c. 416–417: Orosius, The Seven Books of History Against the Pagans, Book 7 (A), 13.4: "Indeed, he [Hadrian] overcame the Jews in a final slaughter, who were disturbed by the disorders of their own crimes and were laying waste the province of Palestine, once their own."
- c. 430: Theodoret, Interpretatio in Psalmos (Theodoretus in notāre ad Psalmos):
  - On Psalm 83 (82): "The other translators call the “aliens” Philistines, whom we name Palestinians. Only these, having been left from the stock of Canaan and dwelling beside Israel, were reasonably called “aliens”".
  - On Psalm 133 (132) "Like dew of Hermon falling on Mount Sion (v. 3). Again he changed to another image, teaching the advantage of harmony; he said it is like the dew carried down from Hermon to Sion. There is so much of it that the jars release drops. Hermon is a mountain – in Palestine, in fact – and some distance from the land of Israel."
- c. 450: Theodoret, Ecclesiastical History: "The see of Caesarea, the capital of Palestine, was now held by Acacius, who had succeeded Eusebius."
- c. 450: Theodoret, The Questions on the Octateuch: "When the Ephraimites tried to deceive them by claiming to be from other tribes, he gave orders that they be asked a certain word so they could be unmasked by their pronunciation. You see, as the Osroënians, the Syrians, the people of the Euphrates, the Palestinians, and the Phoenicians all speak Syriac, but with many differences in pronunciation, so, the twelves tribes, while all Hebrews, probably had some individual peculiarities of speech."
- c. 450: Proclus of Constantinople: "Iosuae Palaestinae exploratori cohibendi solis lunaeque cursum potestatem adtribuit."
- c. 500: Tabula Peutingeriana (map)
- c. 500: Zosimus, New History: "Finding the Palmyrene army drawn up before Emisa, amounting to seventy thousand men, consisting of Palmyrenes and their allies, [Emperor Aurelian] opposed to them the Dalmatian cavalry, the Moesians and Pannonians, and the Celtic legions of Noricum and Rhaetia, and besides these the choicest of the imperial regiment selected man by man, the Mauritanian horse, the Tyaneans, the Mesopotamians, the Syrians, the Phoenicians, and the Palestinians, all men of acknowledged valour; the Palestinians besides other arms wielding clubs and staves."
- c. 550: Madaba map, "οροι Αιγυπτου και Παλαιστινης" (the "border of Egypt and Palestine)
- c. 550: Christian Topography.
- c. 550: John Malalas, Chronographia
- 555: Cyril of Scythopolis, The Life of St. Saba.
- c. 555: Procopius, Of the Buildings of Justinian: "In Palestine there is a city named Neapolis, above which rises a high mountain, called Garizin. This mountain the Samaritans originally held; and they had been wont to go up to the summit of the mountain to pray on all occasions, not because they had ever built any temple there, but because they worshipped the summit itself with the greatest reverence."
- c. 560: Procopius, The Wars of Justinian: "The boundaries of Palestine extend toward the east to the sea which is called the Red Sea." Procopius also wrote that "Chosroes, king of Persia, had a great desire to make himself master of Palestine, on account of its extraordinary fertility, its opulence, and the great number of its inhabitants."
- c.600: De sectis

=== Middle Ages ===
==== Rashidun, Umayyad and Abbasid Caliphates period ====
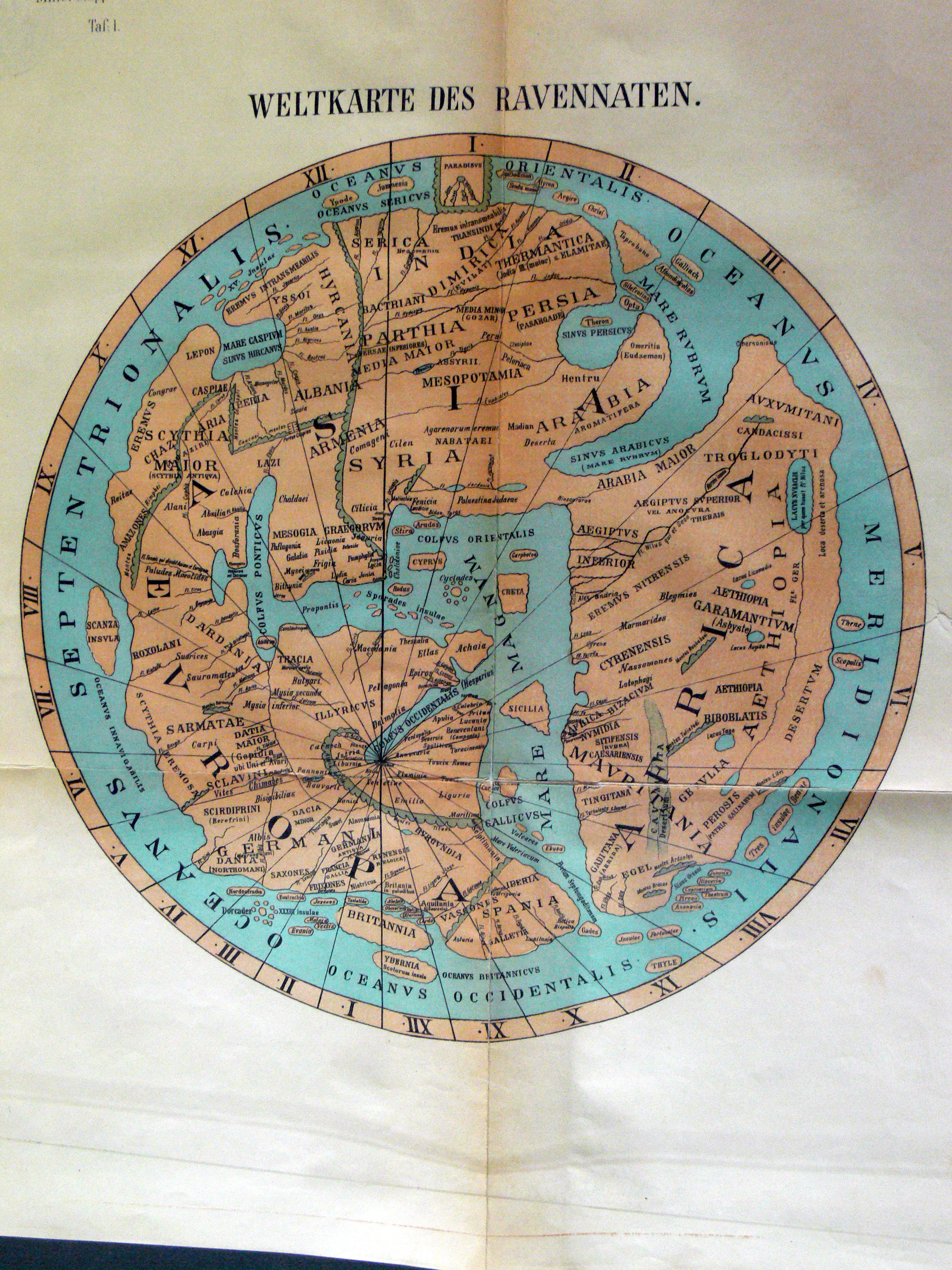
Reconstruction of the c. 700 Ravenna Cosmography showing "Palaestina"

- 629: Heraclius, In 629 Heraclius restored the True Cross to Jerusalem in a majestic ceremony: I.e. the so-called Fast of Heraclius, which immediately preceding Lent, forms the first week of the Great Fast. The origin of this fast is said to be as follows: that the emperor Heraclius, on his way to Jerusalem, promised his protection to the Jews of Palestine, but that on his arrival in the holy city, the schismatical patriarch and the Christians generally prayed him to put all the Jews to the sword, because they had joined the Persians shortly before in their sack of the city and cruelties towards the Christians. (Abu Salih the Armenian, Abu al-Makarim, ed. Evetts 1895, p. 39, Part 7 of Anecdota Oxoniensia: Semitic series Anecdota oxoniensia. Semitic series—pt. VII], at Google Books)
- c. 670: Adomnán, De Locis Sanctis, or the Travels of Arculf: "Que utique Hebron, ut fertur, ante omnes, non solum Palestíne, civitates condita fuerat, sed etiam universas Egyptiacas urbes in sua precessit conditione, que nunc misere monstratur destructa." translated: "This Hebron, it is said, was founded before all the cities, not only of Palestine, but also preceded in its foundation all the cities of Egypt, although it has now been so miserably destroyed."
- c. 700: Ravenna Cosmography
- c. 770: Thawr ibn Yazid, hadith, as quoted in Abu Bakr Muhammad ibn Ahmad al-Wasiti's Fada'il Bayt al-Muqaddas (c. 1019): "The most holy spot [al-quds] on earth is Syria; the most holy spot in Syria is Palestine; the most holy spot in Palestine is Jerusalem [Bayt al-maqdis]; the most holy spot in Jerusalem is the Mountain; the most holy spot in Jerusalem is the place of worship [al-masjid], and the most holy spot in the place of worship is the Dome."
- c. 770: Hygeburg, The Life of Willibald: "Then, having visited the church of St. George at Diospolis [he passed] through Joppe, a coast town of Palestine, where Peter raised to life the widow Dorcas, and went along the shore of the Adriatic Sea, and adored the footsteps of our Lord at Tyre and Sidon. And then, crossing Mount Libanus, and passing through the coast town of Tripoli, he visited Damascus again, and came to Emmaus, a village of Palestine, which the Romans after the destruction of Jerusalem called, after the event of the victory, Nicopolis."
- 810–815: Theophanes the Confessor, Chronicles: Since Muhammad was a helpless orphan, he thought it good to go to a rich woman named Khadija ...to manage her camels and conduct her business in Egypt and Palestine... When he [Muhammad] went to Palestine he lived with both Jews and Christians, and hunted for certain writings among them.
- c. 870: Ibn Khordadbeh, Book of Roads and Kingdoms: "Filastin Province 500,000 dinars of taxes" (c. 864)
- c. 870: al-Baladhuri, Conquests of the Lands Wrote that the main towns of the district, following its conquest by the Rashidun Caliphate, were Gaza, Sebastia (Sebastiya), Nablus, Caesarea, Ludd, Yibna, Imwas, Jaffa, Rafah, and Bayt Jibrin.
- 874: Musa ibn Sahl al-Ramli, Man nazala Filastin min al-sahaba [On the Prophetic Companions who settled in Palestine], the first known Islamic history of Syria in whole or part.
- c. 880: Qudama ibn Ja'far, Kitab Al Kharaj (The Book of the Land Tax): Filastin Province, 195,000 dinars (c. 820)
- 891: Ya'qubi, Book of Lands: "Of the Jund Filastin, the ancient capital was Lydda. The Caliph Sulayman subsequently founded the city of Ramla, which he made the capital.... The population of Palestine consists of Arabs of the tribes of Lakhm, Judham, Amilah, Kindah, Kais and Kinanah"
- c. 900: Limits of the Five Patriarchates: "The first See and the first patriarchate is of Jerusalem, James, the brother of God and apostle and eyewitness, and minister of the word and secrets of secrets and hidden mysteries, contains the whole Palestine a country until Arabia." (Πρῶτος θρόνος καὶ πρώτη πατριαρχία Ἱεροσολύμων, Ἱακώβου τοῦ ἀδελφοθέου καὶ ἀποστόλου, αὐτόπτου καί ὑπηρέτου τοῦ λόγου γενομένου καὶ μύστου τῶν ἀπορρήτων καὶ ἀθεάτων αὐτοῦ μυστηρίων θεαμάτων, περιέχων πᾶσαν τὴν Παλαιστίνων χώραν ἄχρι Ἀραβίας)
- 903: Ibn al-Faqih, Concise Book of Lands
- After 904: Unknown author, possibly al-Masudi, Akhbar al-zaman (The History of Time), "Among children [of] Cainan are Falestin and Ṣidā, who gave their name to two countries".
- c. 913: Ibn Abd Rabbih
- c. 930: Patriarch Eutychius of Alexandria, Eutychii Annales: Chapter II: Adversities of the Church: 1. Persecutions of the Christians: "... The Christians suffered less in this than in the preceding centuries. ... In the East especially in Syria and Palestine the Jews sometimes rose upon the Christians with great violence (Eutyrhius, Annales tom ii., p. 236, &c. Jo. Henr. Hottinger, Historia Orientalis, lib. i., c. id., p. 129, &c.) yet so unsuccessfully as to suffer severely for their temerity."
- before 942: Saadia Gaon (892–942), the great Jewish rabbi and exegete, makes the classic Jewish Arabic translation of the Torah, translating the Hebrew פלשת Pleshet Philistia as פלסטין (using Judeo-Arabic) Filasṭīn, e.g. Exodus 15:14 סכאן פלסטין the inhabitants of Palestine
- 943: Al-Masudi, The Meadows of Gold
- c. 950: Alchabitius, Introduction to the Art of Judgments of the Stars

==== Fatimid Caliphate period ====
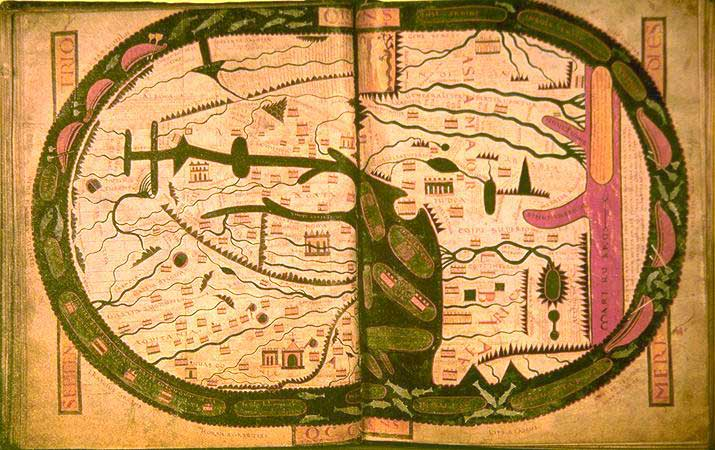
World map c. 1050 by Beatus of Liébana

- 951–978: Istakhri, Traditions of Countries and Ibn Hawqal, The Face of the Earth: "The provinces of Syria are Jund Filstin, and Jund al Urdunn, Jund Dimaskh, Jund Hims, and Jund Kinnasrin.... Filastin is the westernmost of the provinces of Syria... its greatest length from Rafah to the boundary of Lajjun... its breadth from Jaffa to Jericho.... Filastin is the most fertile of the Syrian provinces.... Its trees and its ploughed lands do not need artificial irrigation... In the province of Filastin, despite its small extent, there are about 20 mosques.... Its capital and largest town in Ramla, but the Holy City (of Jerusalem) comes very near this last in size"
- 985: Al-Maqdisi, Description of Syria, Including Palestine: "And further, know that within the province of Palestine may be found gathered together 36 products that are not found thus united in any other land.... From Palestine comes olives, dried figs, raisins, the carob-fruit, stuffs of mixed silk and cotton, soap and kercheifs"
- c. 1000: Suda encyclopedic lexicon: "Παλαιστίνη: ὄνομα χώρας. καὶ Παλαιστι̂νος, ὁ ἀπὸ Παλαιστίνης." / "Palestine: Name of a territory. Also [sc. attested is] Palestinian, a man from Palestine.
- 1029: Rabbi Solomon ben Judah of Jerusalem, a letter in the Cairo Geniza, refers to the province of Filastin
- 1047: Nasir Khusraw, Safarnama / Diary of a Journey through Syria and Palestine: "This city of Ramlah, throughout Syria and the West, is known under the name of Filastin."
- c. 1050: Beatus of Liébana, Beatus map, Illustrates the primitive Diaspora of the Apostles and is one of the most significant cartographic works of the European High Middle Ages.
- 1051: Ibn Butlan

==== Crusaders period ====
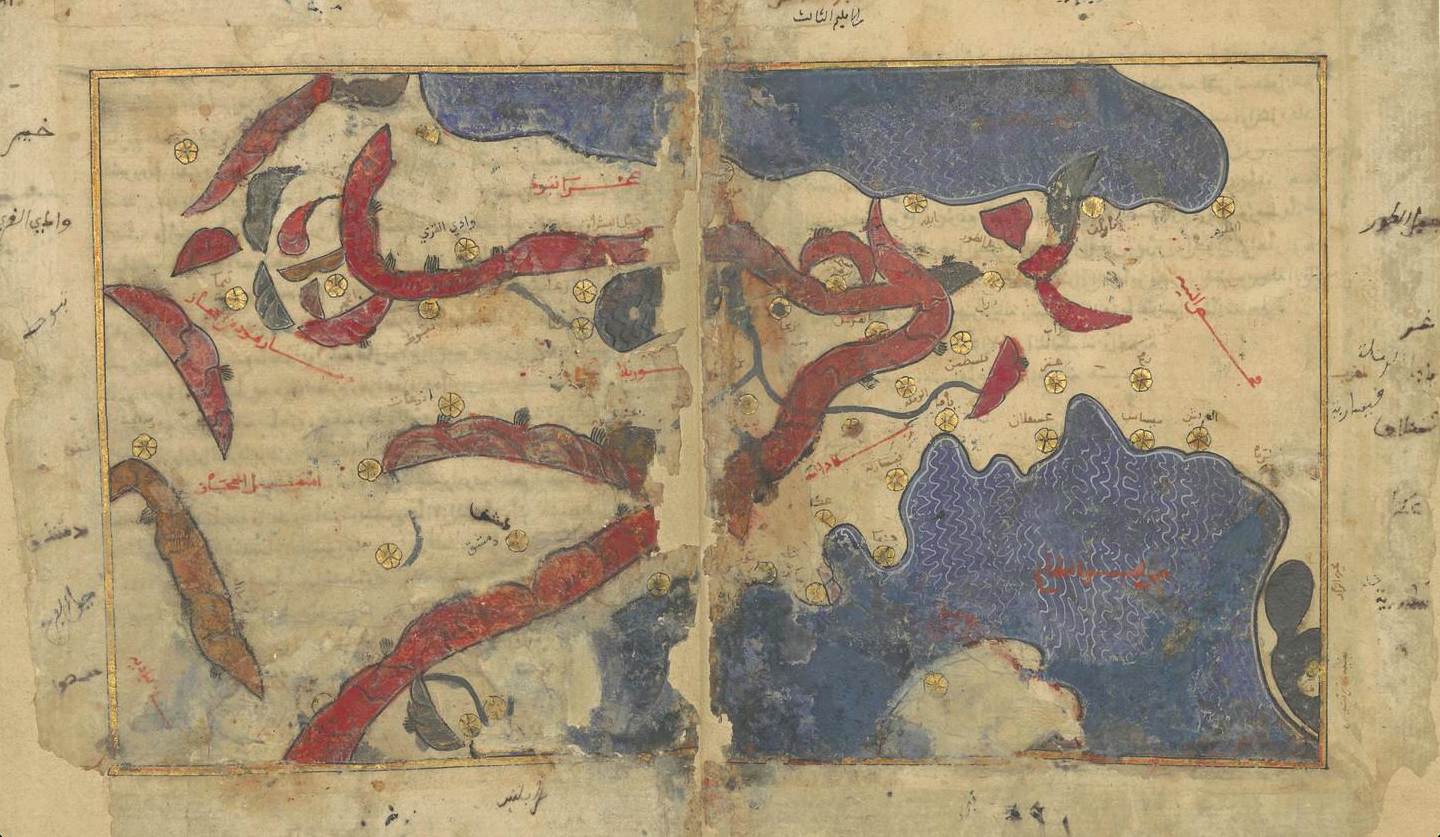
Tabula Rogeriana, showing "Filistin" in Arabic in the middle of the right hand page

- 1101: Nathan ben Jehiel, Arukh: The Lexico Aruch is a talmudical lexicon authored by Rabbi Nathan ben Jehiel, of Rome. The occurrence of פלסטיני Παλαιστίνη [Palestine] in the Genesis Rabbah is noted.
- 1100–27: Fulcher of Chartres, Historia Hierosolymitana (1095–1127): "For we who were Occidentals have now become Orientals. He who was a Roman or a Frank has in this land been made into a Galilean or a Palestinian."
- c. 1130, Fetellus, "The city of Jerusalem is situated in the hill-country of Judea, in the province of Palestine"
- 1154: Muhammad al-Idrisi, Tabula Rogeriana or The Book of Pleasant Journeys into Faraway Lands
- 1160: Abraham ibn Daud, Sefer ha-Qabbalah
- 1170: The Prior of Tewkesbury Abbey wrote that the legends of King Arthur were so well known that "Carthage, Antioch, Armenia and Palestine celebrate his feats".
- 1173: Ali of Herat, Book of Indications to Make Known the Places of Visitations
- 1177: John Phocas, A Brief Description of the Castles and Cities, from the City of Antioch even unto Jerusalem; also of Syria and Phoenicia, and of the Holy Places in Palestine
- c. 1180: William of Tyre, Historia Hierosolymitana
- 1185: Ibn Jubayr, The Travels of Ibn Jubayr

==== Ayyubid and Mamluk periods ====
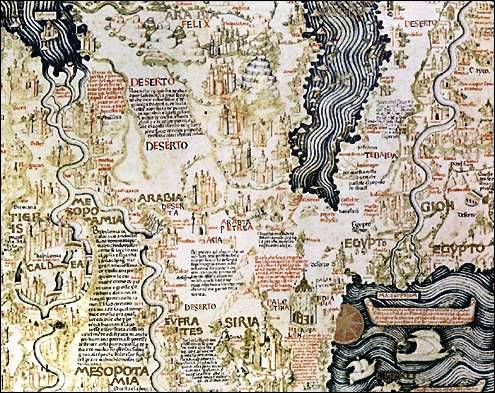
Palestina on the Fra Mauro map, 1459

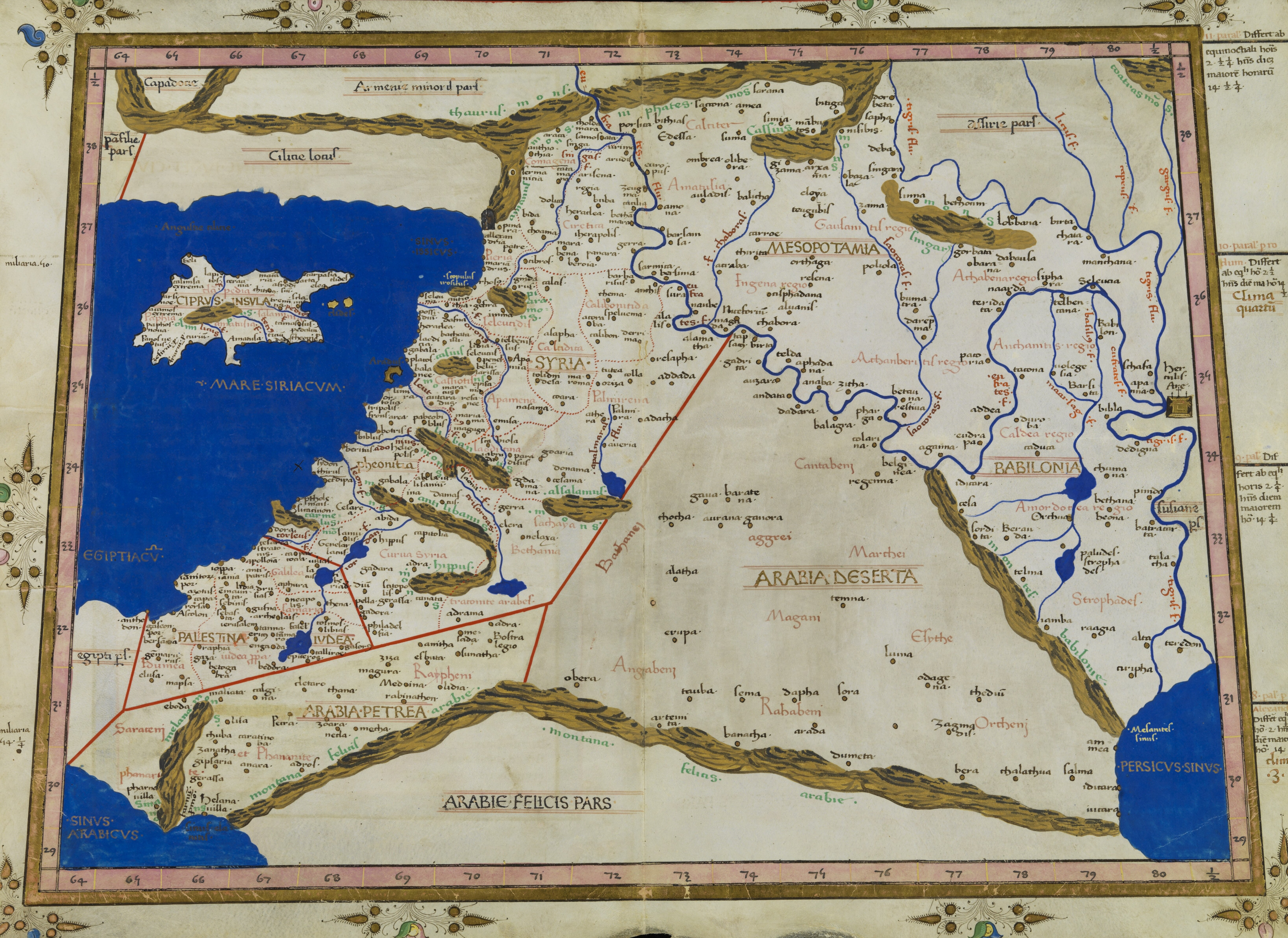
Map of Palestine published in 1467 version of Claudius Ptolemy's Cosmographia by Nicolaus Germanus

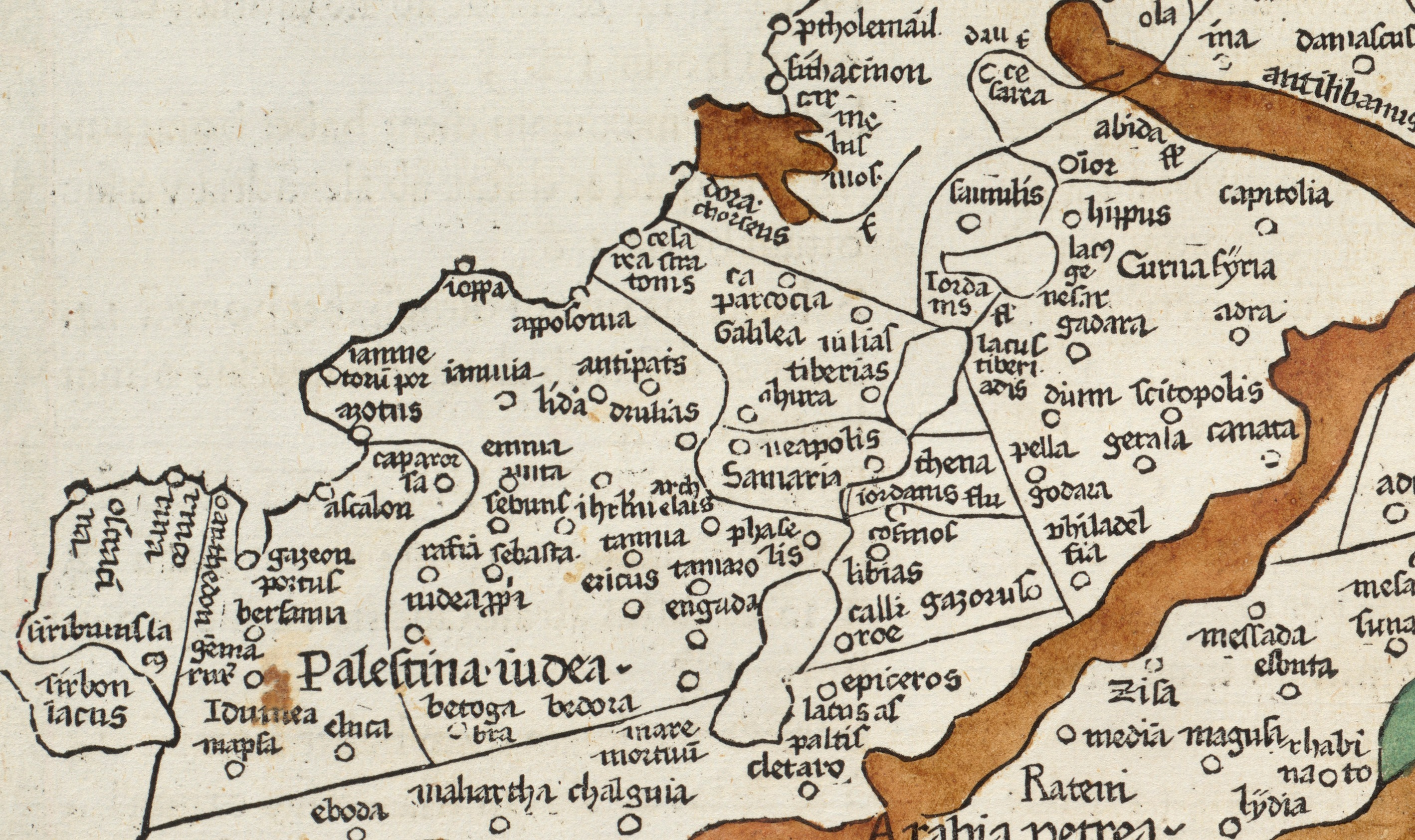
Map of Palestine published in 1482 version of Claudius Ptolemy's Cosmographia by Nicolaus Germanus

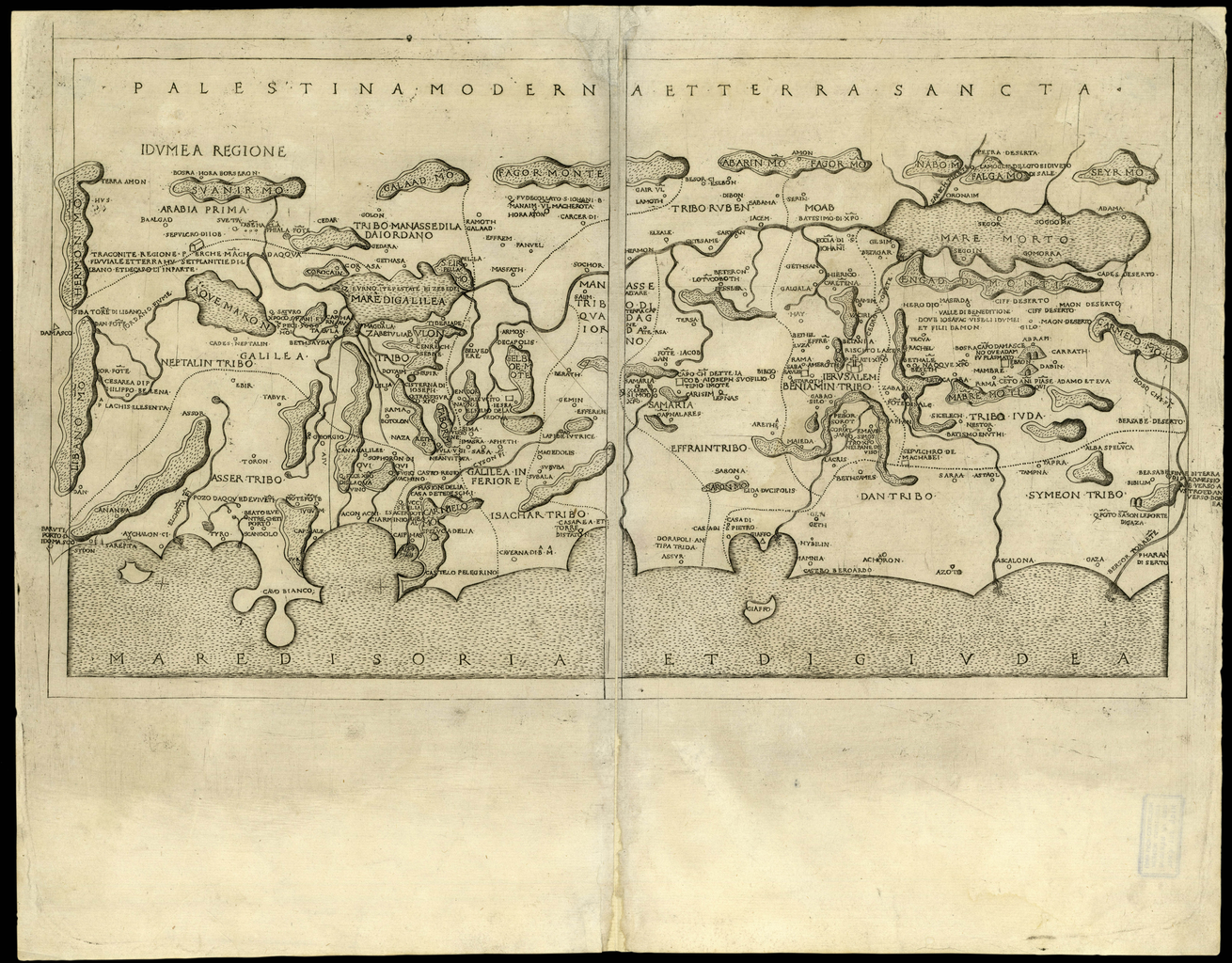
Map of Palestine published in Florence 1482 and included in the Francesco Berlinghieri expanded edition of Ptolemy's Geographia (Geography)

- 1220: Jacques de Vitry, History of Jerusalem: "And there are three Palestines, which are parts of Greater Syria. The first is that whose capital is Jerusalem, and this part is specially named Judaea. The second is that whose capital is Caesarea Philippi, which includes all the country of the Philistines. The third is that whose capital is Scythopolis, which at this day is called Bethshan. Moreover, both the Arabias are parts of Syria: the first is that whose capital is Bostrum; the second is that whose capital is Petra in the Wilderness."
- 1225: Yaqut al-Hamawi, Dictionary of Geographies "Filastin is the last of the provinces of Syria towards Egypt. Its capital is Jerusalem. Of the principal towns are Ashkelon, Ramle, Gaza, Arsuf, Caesarea, Nablus, Jericho, Amman, Jaffa and Bayt Jibrin"
- c.1250 Bar Hebraeus: "[The Syriac language] is divided into three dialects, one of the most elegant is Aramaea, the language of Edessa, Harran, and outer Syria; next adjoining to it is Palestinian, which is used in Damascus, the mountain of Lebanon, and inner Syria; and the vulgar Chaldean Nabataean, which is a dialect of Assyrian mountains and the districts of Iraq."
- c. 1266 Abu al-Makarim, "The Churches and Monasteries of Egypt," Part 7 of Anecdota Oxoniensia: Semitic series Anecdota oxoniensia: At the beginning of the caliphate [of Umar] George was appointed patriarch of Alexandria. He remained four years in possession of the see. Then when he heard that the Muslims had conquered the Romans, and had vanquished Palestine, and were advancing upon Egypt, he took ship and fled from Alexandria to Constantinople; and after his time the see of Alexandria remained without a Melkite patriarch for ninety seven years.
- 1320: Marino Sanuto the Elder, Liber Secretorum Fidelium Crucis: "Also, the three [parts] of Palestine are called the Syrias, of which Syria Quinta is that Palestine which is properly called Philistym. Its chief city is Caesarea, beginning from Castrum Peregrinorum and extending south along the shore of the Mediterranean as far as Gaza in the south. Syria Sexta is the second Palestine whose chief city is Jerusalem including the hill country as far as the Dead Sea and the desert of Cadesbarne. Strictly this country is called Judaea, the name of a part being given to the whole. Syria Septima is the third Palestine whose chief city is Bethsan located under Mount Gelboe near the Jordan and which [contains] Galilee and the great plain of Esdrelon"
- 1321: Abulfeda, A Sketch of the Countries: "The Nahr Abi Futrus is the river that runs near Ramla in Filastin"
- 1322: Ishtori Haparchi, Sefer Kaftor Vaferach, mentions twice that Ramla is also known as Filastin
- 1327: Al-Dimashqi
- 1338 Robert Mannyng The Chronicle
- c. 1350: Guidebook to Palestine (a manuscript primarily based on the 1285–1291 account of Christian pilgrim Philippus Brusserius Savonensis): "It [Jerusalem] is built on a high mountain, with hills on every side, in that part of Syria which is called Judaea and Palestine, flowing with milk and honey, abounding in corn, wine, and oil, and all temporal goods"
- 1351: Jamal ad Din Ahmad, Muthir al Ghiram (The Exciter of Desire) for Visitation of the Holy City and Syria: "Syria is divided into five districts, namely: i. Filastin, whose capital is Aelia (Jerusalem), eighteen miles from Ramla, which is the Holy City, the metropolis of David and Solomon. Of its towns are Ashkelon, Hebron, Sebastia, and Nablus."
- 1355: Ibn Battuta, Rihla Ibn Battuta wrote that Ramla was also known as Filastin
- 1355: Jacopo da Verona: Liber Peregrinationis: "Primo igitur sciendum est. quod in tota Asyria et Palestina et Egipto et Terra Sancta sunt multi cristiani sub potentia soldani subjugati solventes annuale tributum soldano multa et multa milia."
- 1377: Ibn Khaldun, Muqaddimah: "Filastin Province taxes – 310,000 dinars plus 300,000 ratls of olive oil"
- c. 1421: John Poloner "The land which we call the Holy Land came to be divided by lot among the twelve tribes of Israel, and with regard to one part was called the kingdom of Judaea ... with regard to the other part it was called the kingdom of Samaria... Both these kingdoms, together with the land of Philistim, were called Palestine, which was but a part thereof, even as Saxony and Lorraine are parts of Germany, and Lombardy and Tuscany are parts of Italy. And note that there are three Palestines. In the first, the capital city is Jerusalem, with all its hill country even to the Dead Sea and the wilderness of Kadesh Barnea. The second, whose capital city is Caesarea by the sea, with all the land of Philistim' beginning at Petra Incisa, and reaching as far as Gaza, was the Holy Land toward the south. The third is the capital city of Bethsan, at the foot of Mount Gilboa. This was once called Scythopolis, and is the place where the corpses of Saul's soldiers were hung up. This Palestine is properly called Galilee"
- 1430: Abu-l Fida Ishak, Muthir al Ghiram (The Exciter of Desire)
- 1459: Fra Mauro map
- 1470: Al-Suyuti: "Syria is divided into five provinces, or sections:— First, Palestine, so called because first inhabited by Philistin son of Kusin, son of Muti, son of Yūmán, son of Yasith, son of Noah. Its first frontier town is on the Egyptian road Rafah, or Al Arish: next to this is Gaza, then Ramula, or Ramlat Phalistin. Of great cities in Palestine are, Elía, which is the Baitu-l-Mukaddas, eighteen miles from Ramlah (this holy city was the residence of David and Solomon), and Ascalon, and the city of Abraham, and Sebaste, and Neapolis. The whole extent of Palestine is, in length, two days' journey to one who rides at the rate of a slow-moving beast; and in width, from Japha to Jericho, about as much."
- 1480: Felix Fabri "Joppa is the oldest port, and the most ancient city of the province of Palestine"
- 1482: Francesco di Niccolò Berlinghieri, Geographia, a treatise based upon Ptolemy's Geographica: map: Present-Day Palestine and the Holy Land
- 1492: Martin Behaim's "Erdapfel" globe
- 1496: Mujir al-Din al-'Ulaymi, The Glorious History of Jerusalem and Hebron: According to Haim Gerber: "Among other things Mujir al-Din's book is notable for its extensive use of the term "Palestine." The simple fact is that Mujir al-Din calls the country he lives in Palestine (Filastin), a term he repeats 22 times. One other name he uses for the country is the Holy Land, used as frequently as Palestine. No other names, such as Southern Syria, are ever mentioned... What area did he have in mind when speaking about Palestine? It stretched from Anaj, a point near al-Arish, to Lajjun, south of the Esdraelon valley. It was thus clearly equivalent to the Jund Filastin of classical Islam."

=== Early modern period ===
==== Early Ottoman period ====
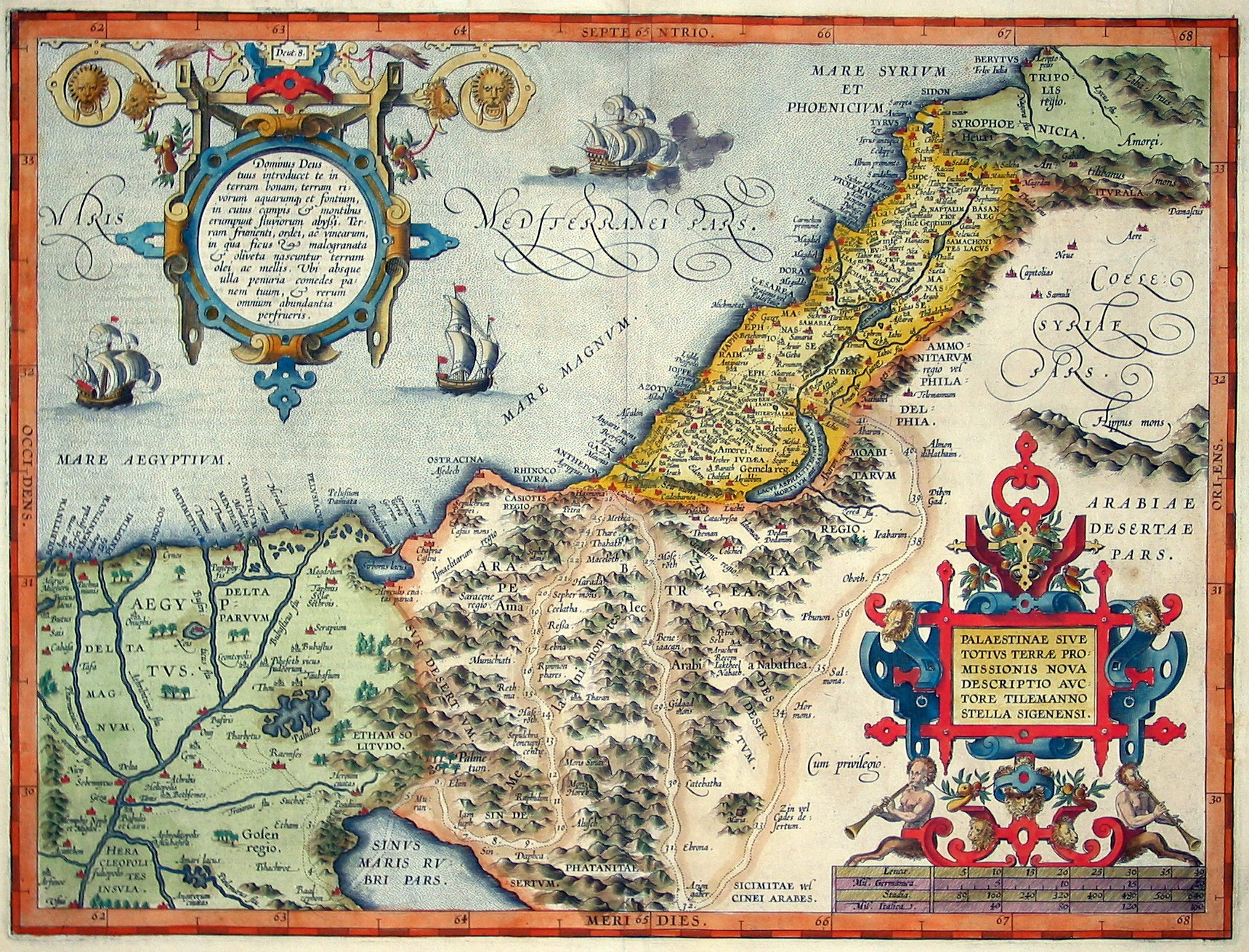
1570 map of Palestine by Ortelius, whose inclusion of biblical Palestine in his contemporary atlas has been described as "loaded with theological, eschatological, and, ultimately, para-colonial Restorationism"

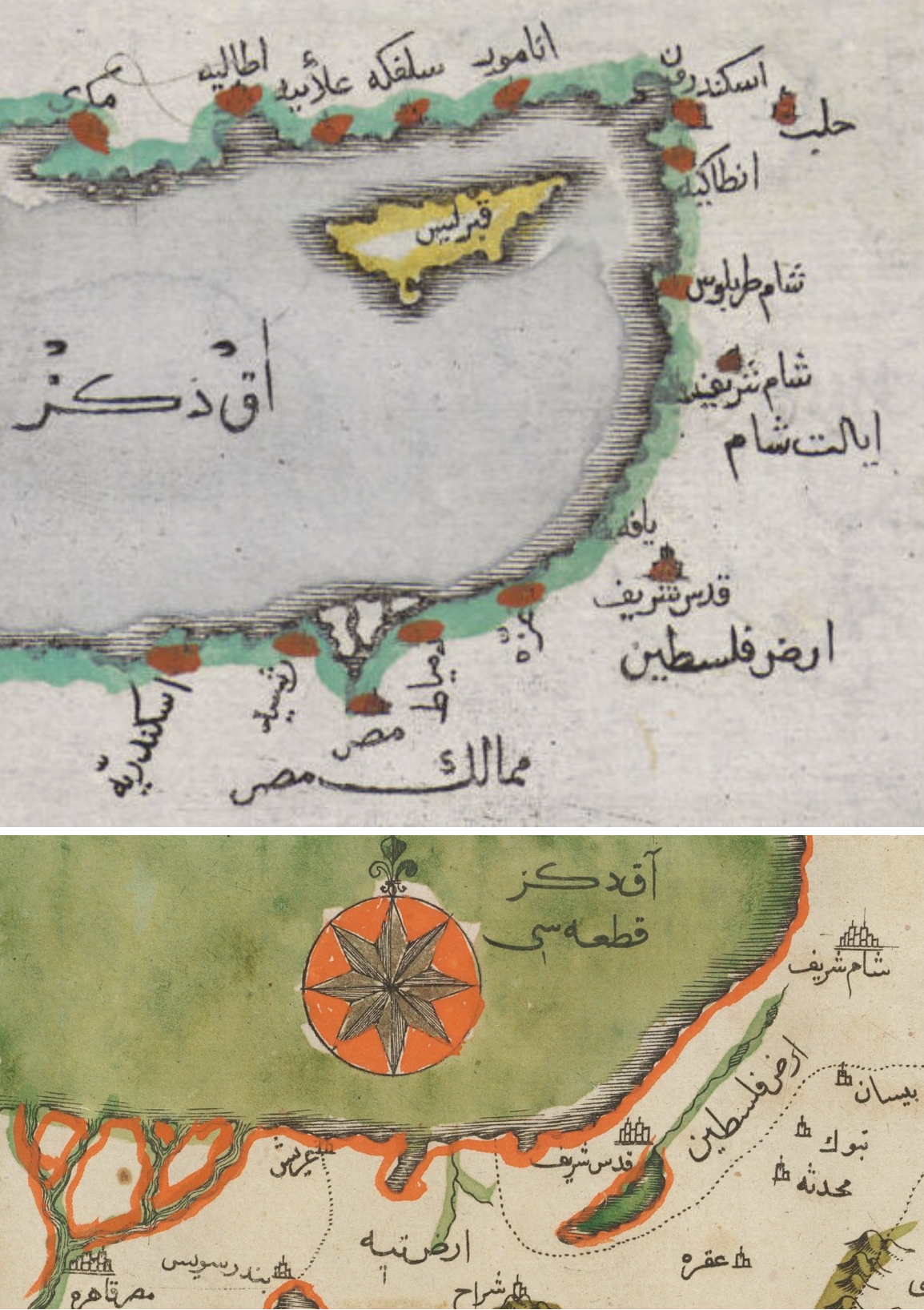
1650s maps of the region by Ottoman geographer Kâtip Çelebi, showing the term ارض فلسطين ("Land of Palestine")

- 1536: Jacob Ziegler, Terrae sanctae, quam palestinam nominant, Syriae, Arabiae, Aegypti & Schondiae doctissima descriptio
- 1540 Guillaume Postel: Syriae Descriptio
- 1553: Pierre Belon, Observations, "De Plusieurs Arbes, Oiseaux, et autres choses singulieres, produictes en la terre de Palestine"
- 1560: Geneva Bible, the first mass-produced English-language Bible, translates the Hebrew פלשת Pleshet as "Palestina" (e.g. Ex. 15:14; Isa. 14:29, 31) and "Palestina"
- c. 1560: Ebussuud Efendi: Ebu Suud is asked in a fatwa, "What is the meaning of the term the Holy Land, arazi-i mukaddese?" His answer is that various definitions of the term exist, among them the whole of Syria, to Aleppo and Ariha in the north. Others equate it with the area of Jerusalem (al-Quds); still others equate it with the term "Palestine."
- c. 1561: Anthony Jenkinson, published by Richard Hakluyt, The Principall Navigations, Voiages, and Discoveries of the English Nation: "I William Harborne, her Majesties Ambassadour, Ligier with the Grand Signior, for the affaires of the Levant Company in her Majesties name confirme and appoint Richard Forster Gentleman, my Deputie and Consull in the parts of Alepo, Damasco, Aman, Tripolis, Jerusalem, and all other ports whatsoever in the provinces of Syria, Palestina, and Jurie, to execute the office of Consull over all our Nation her Majesties subjects"
- 1563: Josse van Lom, physician of Philip II of Spain: A treatise of continual fevers: "Therefore the Scots, English, Livonians, Danes, Poles, Dutch and Germans, ought to take less blood away in winter than in summer; on the contrary, the Portuguese, Moors, Egyptians, Palestinians, Arabians, and Persians, more in the winter than in summer"
- 1563: John Foxe, Foxe's Book of Martyrs: "Romanus, a native of Palestine, was deacon of the church of Casearea at the time of the commencement of Diocletian's persecution."
- c. 1565: Tilemann Stella, map: The Holy Land, the land of promise, which is a part of Syria, the parts that are called Palestina at The Library of Congress
- 1565: Ignazio Danti, map: Anatolian peninsula and Middle East in the Palazzo Vecchio (Florence town hall)
- 1570: Abraham Ortelius, Theatrum Orbis Terrarum (Theatre of the World), map: Palestinæ
- 1570: Theatrum Orbis Terrarum, folio 51
- 1577: Holinshed's Chronicles: "The principal and chief cause I suppose and think to be, because that whereas the patriarch of Jerusalem named Heraclius came in an ambassage unto him, in the name and behalf of all the whole land of Palestine called the Holy Land, requesting that he would take upon him to be their help, and defending the same against the Saladin then king of Egypt and of Damascus"
- 1583: Leonhard Rauwolf, Leonis Flaminii Itinerarium per Palaestinam Das ist, Eine mit vielen schönen Curiositaeten angefüllte Reiß-Beschreibung
- 1591: Johannes Leunclavius: Historiae Musulmanae Turcorum Latin: "Cuzzimu barec ea ciuitas est Palæstinæ, quam veteres Hierosolyma dixerunt, Hebræi Ierusalem. Nomen hodiernum significa locum benedictum vel inclytum," translates as "Quds Barış is the city of the Palestinians, also known as Hierosolyma, in Hebrew, Jerusalem. The name means the holy one or the glorious one"
- 1591: Giovanni Botero
- 1594: Uri ben Shimon and Jakob Christmann (ed.): Calendarium Palaestinorum Et Universorum Iudaeorum... "Auctore Rabbi Ori filio Simeonis, Iudeo Palaestino" [Author Rabbi Uri son of Simeon, Palestinian Jew]"
- 1596: Giovanni Antonio Magini, Geographia, Cosmographia, or Universal Geography: An atlas of Claudius Ptolemy's world of the 2nd century, with maps by Giovanni Antonio Magini of Padua, map: Palaestina, vel Terra Sancta, at Google Books
- c. 1600: Shakespeare: The Life and Death of King John: Scene II.1 "Richard, that robb'd the lion of his heart, and fought the holy wars in Palestine" / Othello Scene IV.3: "I know a lady in Venice would have walked barefoot to Palestine for a touch of his [Lodovico's] nether lip."
- 1607: Hans Jacob Breuning von Buchenbach, Enchiridion Orientalischer Reiß Hanns Jacob Breunings, von vnnd zu Buchenbach, so er in Türckey, benandtlichen in Griechenlandt, Egypten, Arabien, Palestinam, vnd in Syrien, vor dieser zeit verrichtet (etc.)
- 1610: Douay–Rheims Bible, uses the name Palestine (e.g. Jer 47:1; Ez 16:"1 And the word of the Lord came to me, saying: 2 Son of man, make known to Jerusalem her abominations. 3 And thou shalt say: Thus saith the Lord God to Jerusalem:...56 as it is at this time, making thee a reproach of the daughters of Syria, and of all the daughters of Palestine round about thee, that encompass thee on all sides.")
- 1611: King James Version, translates the Hebrew פלשת Pleshet as "Palestina" (e.g. Ex. 15:14; Isa. 14:29, 31) and "Palestine" (e.g. Jl 3:4)
- 1613: Salomon Schweigger, Ein newe Reyßbeschreibung auß Teutschland nach Constantinopel und Jerusalem
- 1616: Pietro Della Valle: Viaggi di Pietro della Valle il Pellegrino
- 1624: Francis Bacon, New Atlantis, "The Phoenicians, and especially the Tyrians, had great fleets; so had the Carthaginians their colony, which is yet farther west. Toward the east the shipping of Egypt, and of Palestine, was likewise great."
- 1625: Samuel Purchas, Hakluytus Posthumus, "And lastly, in the more Eastward, and South parts, as in that part of Cilicia, that is beyond the River Piramus, in Syria, Palestine, Ægypt and Lybia, the Arabian Tongue hath abolished it"
- 1637: Philipp Cluverius, Introductionis in universam Geographiam (Introduction to World Geography), map: Palaestina et Phienice cum parte Coele Syria
- 1639: Thomas Fuller, The Historie of the Holy Warre also A Pisgah sight of Palestine
- 1642: Vincenzo Berdini, Historia dell'antica, e moderna Palestina, descritta in tre parti.
- 1647: Sadiq Isfahani, The Geographical Works of Sadik Isfahani: "Filistin, a region of Syria, Damascus, and Egypt, comprising Ramla, Ashkelon, Beit al Mukuddes (Jerusalem), Kanaan, Bilka, Masisah, and other cities; and from this province is denominated the "Biaban-i Filistin" (or Desert of Palestine), which is also called the "Tiah Beni-Israil""
- 1648–57: Kâtip Çelebi, Cihânnümâ (printed by Ibrahim Muteferrika in 1729); the first detailed Ottoman mapping of its Syrian provinces: "The clime of Syria is divided into a number of provinces (eyālet). One is Shām, [M 562] which consists of Damascus. The others are Jerusalem, Tripoli, Sidon, and Aleppo. Syria is then subdivided into ten sanjaks: Damascus, which is the pasha sanjak, Jerusalem, Gaza, Nablus, ʿAj[l]ūn, Lajjūn, Ṣafad, Sidon, Beirut, and Ḳarak and Shawbak. However, Jerusalem, Gaza, Nablus, ʿAjlūn and Ṣafad are a separate group. The noblest of the administrative divisions of Syria is Palestine. Let me begin with it because it includes the district of Jerusalem... Palestine is composed of two sanjaks: Gaza and Jerusalem. Borders: In the southwest the border goes from the Mediterranean and al-ʿArīsh to the Wilderness of the Israelites [Tīh = Sinai]. In the southeast it is the Dead Sea [Bahar Lut] and the Jordan River. In the north it goes from the Jordan River to the borders of Urdun as far as Caesarea."
- c. 1649: Evliya Çelebi, Travels in Palestine: "All chronicles call this country the Land of Palestine"
- 1649: Johann Heinrich Alsted, Scientiarum Omnium Encyclopaedia: XI. Palestina lacus tres sunt, è quibus duo posteriores natissimi sum historia sacra (11. Palestine has three lakes, the later two of these I relate to Biblical history)

⟨1650⟩

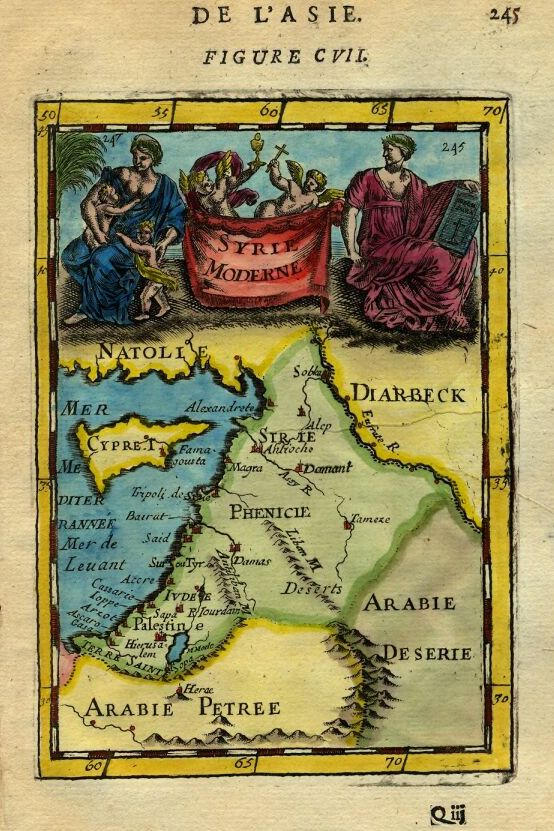
Map of Syrie Moderne (1683) from Description De l'Universe by Alain Manesson Mallet

- 1655: Christoph Heidmann, Palaestina: CAPUT V. – De Urbibus Maritimis Philistaeorum, et aliis ad limitem usq AEgypti. Palaestina propriè dicta est ea terrae sanctae pars, quae ad mare Mediterraneum sita urbes aliquot illustres, & reges potentes olim habuit: quod antè etiam indicatum. Populus Philistini sive Philistaei, aut Philistiim appellati, corruptè Palaestini, Graecis, ut & Sulpicio Severo, ???, id est peregrini Ita gentes vocabant à religione & ritibus Iudaeorum aver fas. 2. Hieronymus Philistiim prius Chasloím appellatos ait, posteros Cham, quos nos inquit, corrupté Palaestinos dicimus 3. Fines ejus â Castro peregrinorum seu Dor, aut Caesarea Palaestinae, vel turre Stratonis, usque Gazam, aut torrentem AEgypti, extendir Adrichomius, aitque Enakim inter cos, id est gigantes fuisse robustissimos.
- 1660: Manuel de Almeida, Historia de Etiopía a Alta ou Abassia (reprinted in 1710): "This same name [Ethiopia] also denotes those Countries lying along the Red Sea, on the side of Arabia, as far as Palastine, which in Holy Writ are call'd Ethiopia."
- 1664: Jean de Thévenot, Relation d'un voyage fait au Levan: Acre est une ville de Palestine située au bord de la mer, elle s'appelloit anciennement Acco.
- c. 1670: Khayr al-Din al-Ramli, al-Fatawa al-Khayriyah: According to Haim Gerber "on several occasions Khayr al-Din al-Ramli calls the country he was living in Palestine, and unquestionably assumes that his readers do likewise. What is even more remarkable is his use of the term "the country" and even "our country" (biladuna), possibly meaning that he had in mind some sort of a loose community focused around that term." Gerber describes this as "embryonic territorial awareness, though the reference is to social awareness rather than to a political one."
- c. 1670: Salih b. Ahmad al-Timurtashi, The Complete Knowledge of the Limits of the Holy Land and Palestine and Syria (Sham).
- 1677: Olfert Dapper, Precise Description of whole Syria, and Palestine or Holy Land, 'Naukeurige Beschrijving van Gantsch Syrie en Palestijn of Heilige Lant'
- 1681: Olfert Dapper, Asia, oder genaue und gründliche Beschreibung des ganzen Syrien und Palestins, oder Gelobten Landes (Asia, or accurate and thorough description of all Syria and Palestine, or the promised land. (German text; Amsterdam 1681 & Nürnberg 1688)): Gewisse und Gründliche Beschreibung des Gelobten Landes / sonsten Palestina geheissen (Certain and thorough description of the Promised Land / otherwise called Palestine)
- c. 1682: Zucker Holy Land Travel Manuscript: Antiochia die vornehmste und hauptstadt des ganzen Syrien (und auch Palestinia) [Antioch the capital and chief of the whole Syria (and Palestine)]. (p. 67 Calesyria)
- 1683: Alain Manesson Mallet, Description De l'Univers: map: Syrie Moderne at Archive.org.
- 1688: John Milner, A Collection of the Church-history of Palestine: Hitherto of Places, now follows an account of the Persons concerned in the Church-History of Palestine. (Milner 1688, p. 19, at Google Books)
- 1688: Edmund Bohun, A Geographical Dictionary, Representing the Present and Ancient Names of All the Countries: Jerusalem, Hierosolyma, the Capital City of Palestine, and for a long time of the whole Earth; taken notice of by Pliny, Strabo, and many of the Ancients.
- 1693: Patrick Gordon (Ma FRS), Geography Anatomiz'd: Palestine, or Judea, Name.] This Country ...is term'd by the Italians and Spaniards, Palestina; by the French, Palestine; by the Germans Palestinen, or das Gelobte Land; by the English, Palestine, or the Holy Land. (Gordon 1704, p. 290, at Google Books)
- 1696: Matthaeus Hiller, Philistaeus exul, s. de origine, diis et terra Palaestinorum diss.
- 1703: Henry Maundrell, A journey from Aleppo to Jerusalem at Easter, A.D. 1697: For the husbanding of these mountains, their manner was to gather up the stones, and place them in several lines, along the sides of the hills, in form of a wall. By such borders, they supported the mould from tumbling, or being washed down; and formed many beds of excellent soil, rising gradually one above another, from the bottom to the top of the mountains. Of this form of culture you see evident footsteps, wherever you go in all the mountains of Palestine. Thus the very rocks were made fruitful And perhaps there is no spot of ground in this whole land, that was not formerly improved, to the production of something or other, ministering to the sustenance of human life.
- 1704: Martin Baumgarten, Travels through Egypt, Arabia, Palestine, and Syria, 'A Collection of Voyages and Travels: Some Now First Printed from Original Manuscripts': Gaza, or Gazera, was once a great and strong City, and one of the five principal ones in Palestine, and was call'd so by the Persians.
- 1709: Matthäus Seutter, map: Deserta Aegypti, Thebaidis, Arabiae, Syriae etc. ubi accurata notata sunt loca inhabitata per Sanctos Patres Anachoretas at The Library of Congress
- 1714: Johann Ludwig Hannemann, Nebo Chemicus Ceu Viatorium Ostendens Viam In Palestinam Auriferam
- 1714: Adriaan Reland, Hadriani Relandi Palaestina ex monumentis veteribus illustrata: CAPUT VII. DE NOMINE PALAESTINAE. [i.]Regio omnis quam Judaei incoluerunt nomen Palaestinae habuit. [ii.]Hebraeorum scriptores, Philo, Josephus, & alii hoc nomine usi. [iii.] פלסטיני in antiquissimis Judaeorum scriptis. (Chapter 7. Palestine. [i.]The country that the Jews inhabited was called Palestine. [ii.]The Hebrew Scriptures, Philo, Josephus, et al. who have used this name. [iii.] פלסטיני [Palestinian] in ancient Jewish writings.) [...] Chapter 8. Syria-Palaestina, Syria, and Coelesyria. Herodotus described Syria-Palaestina. The Palestinian southern boundary is lake Serbonian. Jenysus & Jerusalem are cities of Palestine, as is Ashdod and Ashkelon. Palestine is different from Phoenice. map: Palaestina prima.
- 1717: Laurent d'Arvieux, Voyage dans la Palestine
- 1718: Isaac de Beausobre, David Lenfant, Le Nouveau Testament de notre seigneur Jesus-Christ: On a déja eu occasion de parler des divers noms, que portoit autrefois la Terre d Israël, Ici nous désignerons sous le nom de Palestine qui est le plus commun. (We previously spoke of the various names for the Land of Israel, ...Now we will refer to the Land of Israel by the name of Palestine which is the most common)
- 1718: John Toland, Nazarenus: or Jewish, Gentile and Mahometan Christianity: NOW if you'll suppose with me (till my proofs appear) this pre-eminence and immortality of the Mosaic Republic in its original purity, it will follow; that, as the Jews known at this day, and who are dispers'd over Europe, Asia, and Africa, with some few in America, are found by good calculation to be more numerous than either the Spaniards (for example) or the French: so if they ever happen to be resettl'd in Palestine upon their original foundation, which is not at all impossible; they will then, by reason of their excellent constitution, be much more populous, rich, and powerful than any other nation now in the world. I Wou'd have you consider, whether it be not both the interest and duty of Christians to assist them in regaining their country. But more of this when we meet. I am with as much respect as friendship (dear Sir) ever yours, [signed] J.T. [at] Hague 1719 (Toland 1718, p. 8 at Google Books).
- 1720: Richard Cumberland, Sanchoniatho's Phoenician History: That the Philistines who were of Mizraim's family, were the first planters of Crete. ...I observe that in the Scripture language the Philistines are call'd Cerethites, Sam. xxx. 14, 16. Ezek. xxv. 16. Zeph. ii. 5. And in the two last of these places the Septuagint translates that word Cretes. The name signifies archers, men that in war were noted for skill in using bows and arrows. ...[I] believe that both the people and the religion, (which commonly go together) settled in Crete, came from these Philistines who are originally of Ægyptian race.
- 1730: Joshua Ottens, map: Persia (Iran, Iraq, Turkey)
- 1736: Herman Moll, map: Turkey in Asia
- 1737: Isaac Newton, Interpretation of Daniel's Prophecies
- 1738: D. Midwinter, A New Geographical Dictionary ... to which is now added the latitude and longitude of the most considerable cities and towns,&c., of the world: Jerusalem, Palestine, Asia – [Latitude 32 44 N] – [Longitude 35 15 E]
- 1741: William Cave, Scriptorum eccleriasticorum historia literaria
- 1741: Jonas Korten, Jonas Kortens Reise nach dem weiland Gelobten nun aber seit 1700 Jahren unter dem Fluche ligenden Lande, wie auch nach Egypten, dem Berg Libanon, Syrien und Mesopotamien.
- 1743: Richard Pococke: Description of the East
- 1744: Charles Thompson (fict. name.), The travels of the late Charles Thompson esq.: I shall henceforwards, without Regard to geographical Niceties and Criticisms, consider myself as in the Holy Land, Palestine or Judea; which Names I find used indifferently, though perhaps with some Impropriety, to signify the same Country.
- 1744: Johann Christoph Harenberg, La Palestine ou la Terre Sainte: Map: Palaestina seu Terra olim tum duodecim tribubus distributa, tum a Davide et Salomone, et Terra Gosen at the National Library of Israel.
- 1746: Modern History Or the Present State of All Nations: "Palestine, or the Holy Land, sometimes also called Judea, is bound by Mount Libanus on the north; by Arabia Deserta on the east; by Arabia Petrea on the south; and by the Mediterranean Sea on the west"
- 1747: The modern Gazetteer: "Palestine, a part of Asiatic Turkey, is situated between 36 and 38 degrees of E longitude and between 31 and 34 degrees of N latitude, bounded by the Mount Libanus, which divides it from Syria, on the North, by Mount Hermon, which separates it from Arabia Deserta, on the East, by the mountains of Seir, and the deserts of Arabia Petraea, on the South, and by the Mediterranean Sea on the West, so that it seems to have been extremely well secured against foreign invasions."

⟨1750⟩

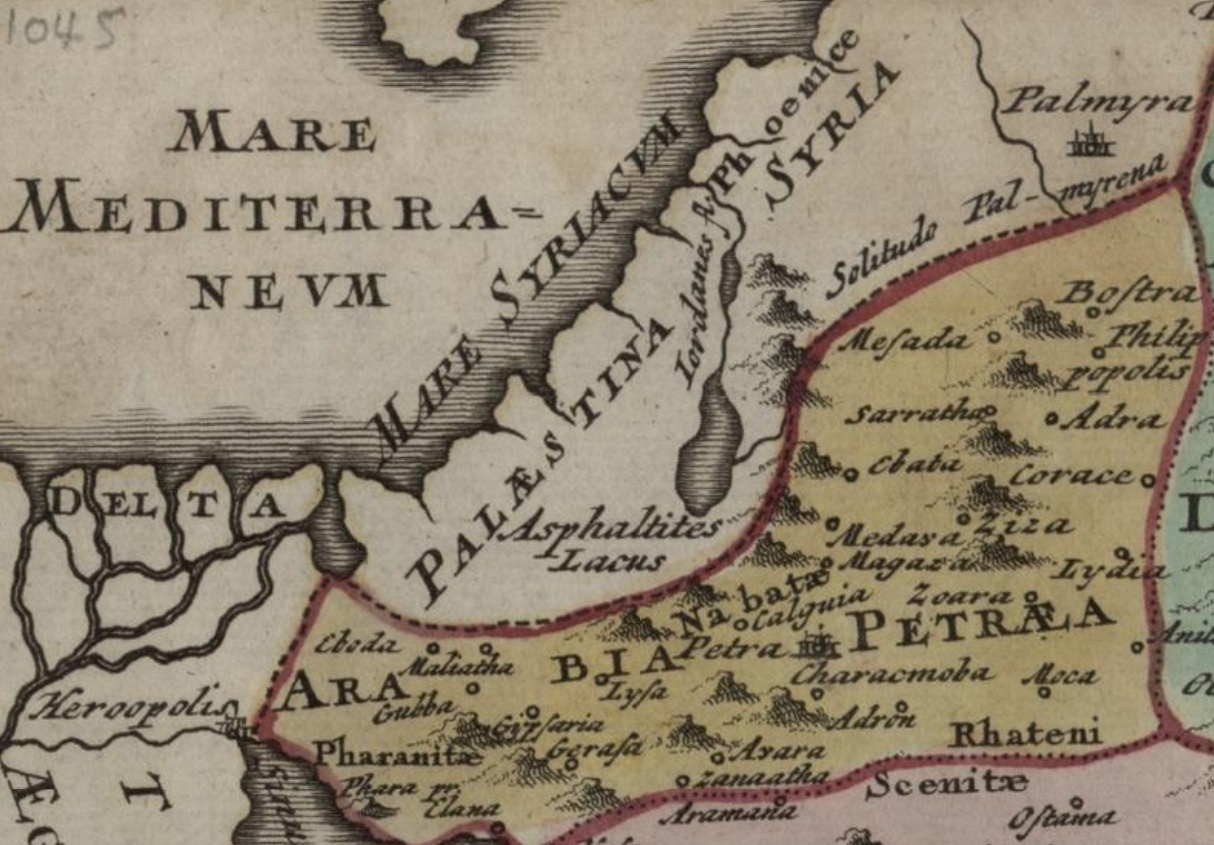
Published 1720

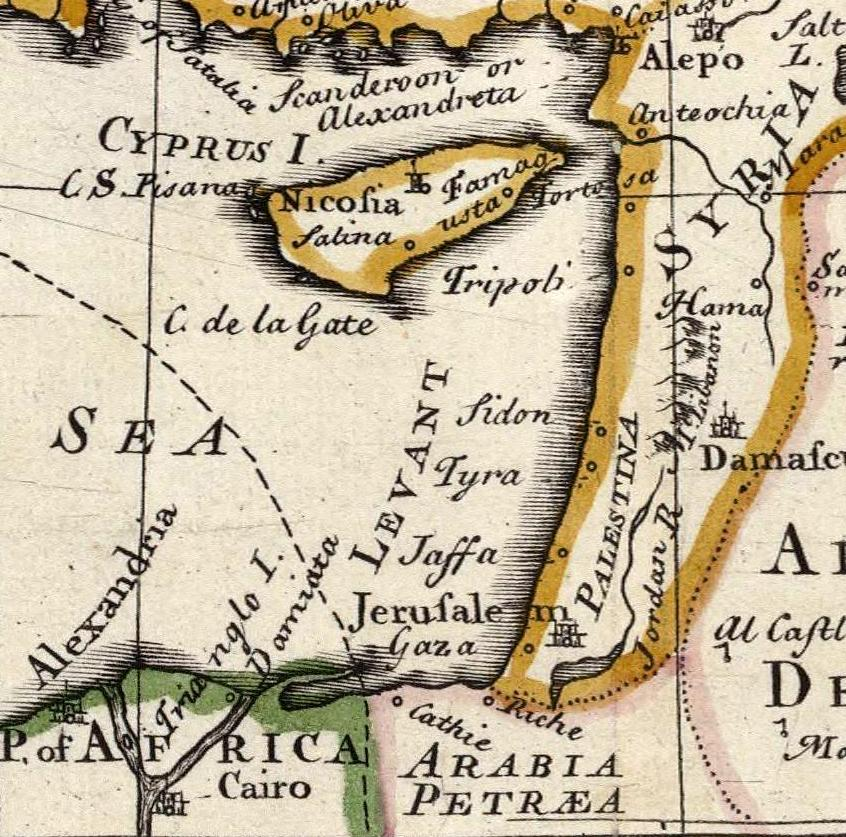
Published 1736

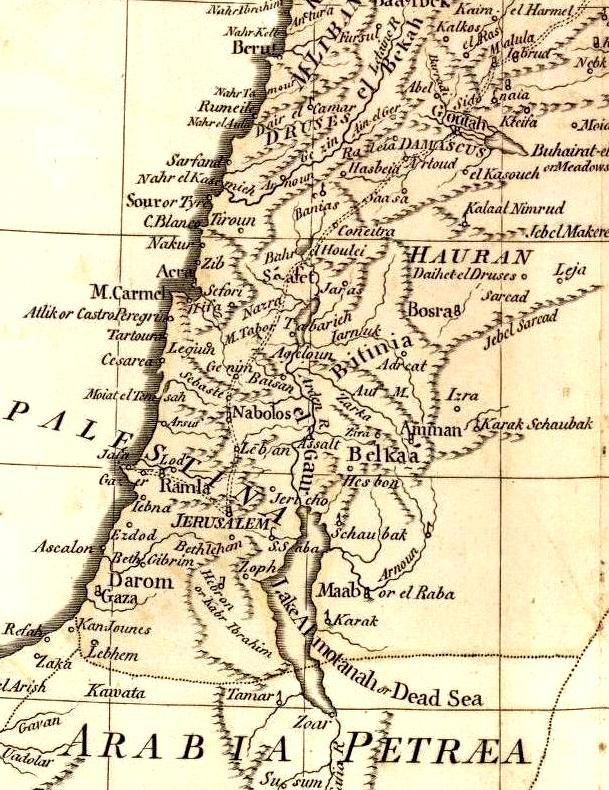
Published 1794

18th century maps of Ottoman Syria identifying the region of Palestine

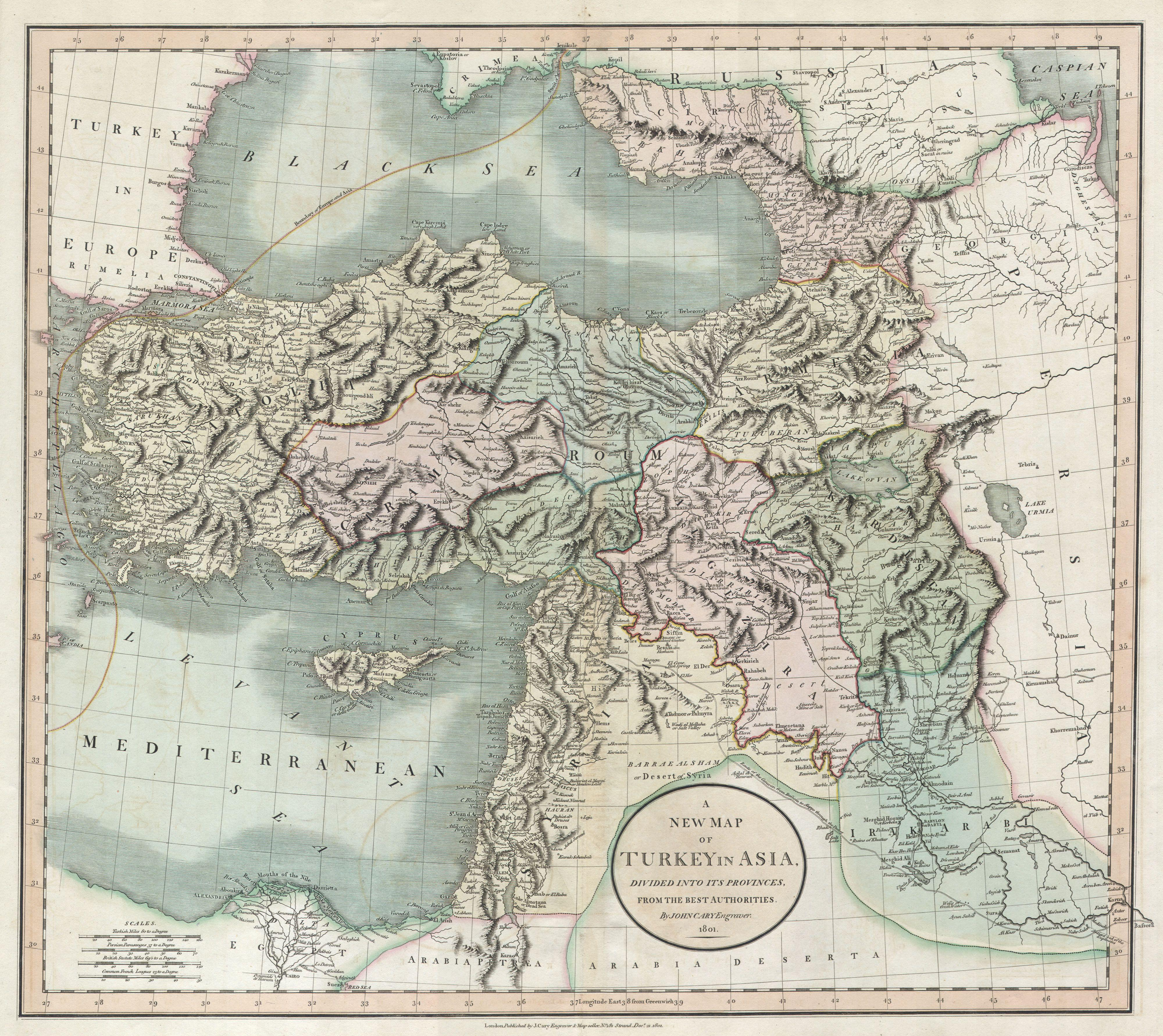
1801 map of Turkey in Asia by English Cartographer John Cary. With Syria and Palestine

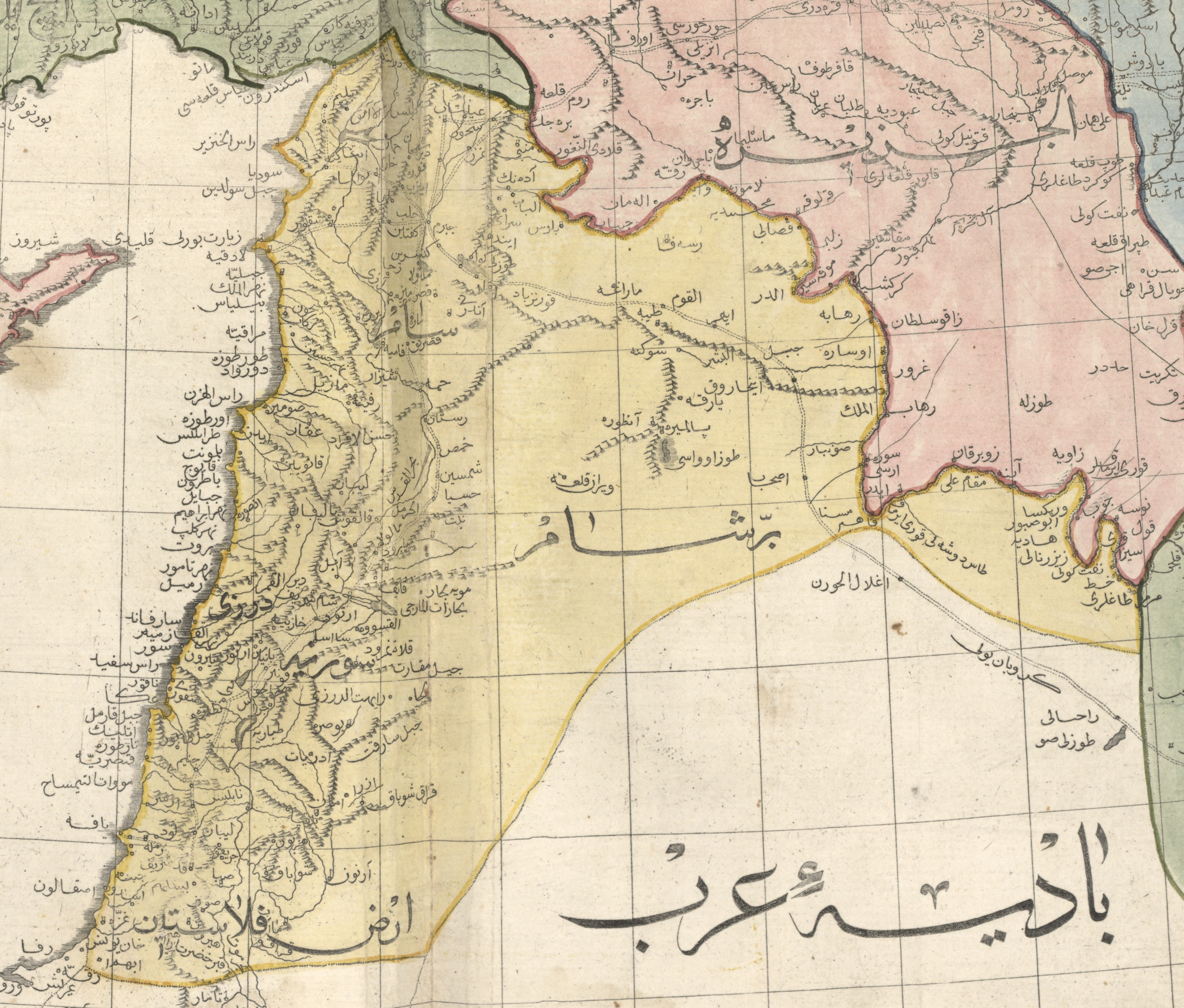
Ottoman Syria in the 1803 Cedid Atlas, showing the term "ارض فلاستان" ("Land of Palestine") in large script on the bottom left

- 1750: Vincenzo Ludovico Gotti, Veritas religionis christianae contra atheos, polytheos, idololatras, mahometanos, [et] judaeos ...
- 1751: The London Magazine
- 1759: Johannes Aegidius van Egmont, John Heyman (of Leydon), Travels Through Part of Europe, Asia Minor, the Islands of the Archipelago, Syria, Palestine, Egypt, Mount Sinai, &c. &c.: The Jews of Jerusalem are divided into three sects, the Karaites, who adhere to the letter of the Scripture, without admitting any comments, or glosses; the Rabbinists, who receive for indubitable truths, all the comments and traditions so well known in the world, and are hence much more superstitious than the former; the third are the Askenites, who come from Germany, and are known among their brethren by the name of new converts; not being descended from the twelve tribes. [...] Besides these three sects, there is in the country of Palestine a fourth sort of Jews, but sworn enemies to the others, I mean the Samaritans; these have frequently endeavoured by the arts of bribery to obtain the privilege of living in Jerusalem, and in order to accomplish this design, have lavished away above five hundred purses.
- 1763: Voltaire, The Works of M. de Voltaire: Additions to the essay on general history: The same may be said of the prohibition of eating pork, blood, or the flesh of beasts dying of any disease; these are precepts of health. The flesh of swine in particular is a very unwholesome food in those hot countries, as well as in the Palestine, that lies in their neighbourhood. When the Mahometan religion spread itself into colder climates, this abstinence ceased to be reasonable; but nevertheless did not cease to be in force. (Voltaire, ed. Smollett and Francklin 1763, p. 42 at Google Books)
- 1765: Christoph Schrader, Gebhardt Theodor Meier, Tabulae chronologicae a prima rerum origine et inde ad nostra tempora: 225 CE. Jews were allowed to live in Palestine.
- 1778: Denis Diderot, Encyclopédie, "Palestine."
- 1779: George Sale, Ancient Part of Universal History: "How Judæa came to be called also Phœnice, or Phœnicia, we have already shewn in the history of that nation. At present, the name of Palestine is that which has most prevailed among the Christian doctors, Mahommedan and other writers. (See Reland Palestin. illustrat.)"
- 1782: Johann Georg Meusel, Bibliotheca historica:

Sectio I. Scriptores de Palaestina

I. Scriptores universales

A. Itineraria et Topographiae a testibus oculatis conditae. 70
B. Geographi Palaestinae recentiores, qui non ipsi terram istam perlustrarunt, sed ex itinerariis modo recensitis aliisque fontibus sua depromserunt. 94

II. Scriptores de Palaestina Speciales

A. Scriptores de aere folo et fetilitate Palaestinae. 110
[...]
E. Scriptores de variis argumentis aliis hue pertinentibus. 117

- 1788: Constantine de Volney, Travels through Syria and Egypt, in the years 1783, 1784, and 1785: Palestine abounds in sesamum from which oil is procured and doura as good as that of Egypt. ...Indigo grows without cultivating on the banks of the Jordan, in the country of Bisan. ...As for trees, the olive-tree of Provence grows at Antioch and Ramla, to the height of the beech. ...there were in the gardens of Yaffa, two plants of the Indian cotton-tree which grow rapidly, nor has this town lost its lemons, its enormous citrons, or its water melons. ...Gaza produces dates like Mecca, and pomegranates like Algiers.
- 1791: Giovanni Mariti, Travels Through Cyprus, Syria, and Palestine; with a General History of the Levant. Translated from the Italian: OF THE HEBREWS. TWO kinds of Jews are found in Syria and Palestine; one of which are originally from these countries, and the other foreigners. A diversity of religious systems divides them, as well as all the other nations on the earth, who give too much importance to the spirit of theological dispute. They are distinguished into Talmudists, and Caraites, or enemies of the Talmud: and such is the inveterate hatred of the latter against the rest of their brethren, that they will not suffer them to be interred in the same burying-grounds, where all mankind in the like manner must moulder in-to dust.
- 1794: Jean Baptiste Bourguignon d'Anville, map: A New Map of Turkey in Asia
- 1799: Pierre Jacotin, Napoleon's director of surveyancing, begins work on the "Jacotin Map": The region is labelled "Palestine" in French and فلسطين أو أرض قدس ("Palestine or Holy Land") in Arabic
- 1801: Thomas Roberts (toxophilite), The English Bowman, Or Tracts on Archery: "The Philistines, indeed, are frequently noticed in sacred history, as men very skilful in the use of the bow. And to this ancient people, who appear to have been a very warlike nation, the invention of the bow and arrow has been ascribed. Universal Hist. (anc. part) vol. 2. p. 220."
- 1803: Cedid Atlas, showing the term ارض فلاستان ("Land of Palestine")

=== Modern period ===
==== Late Ottoman period ====
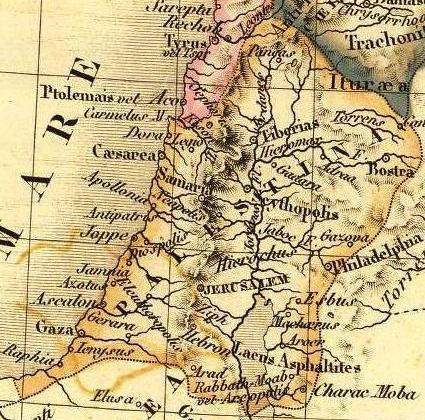
Published 1839

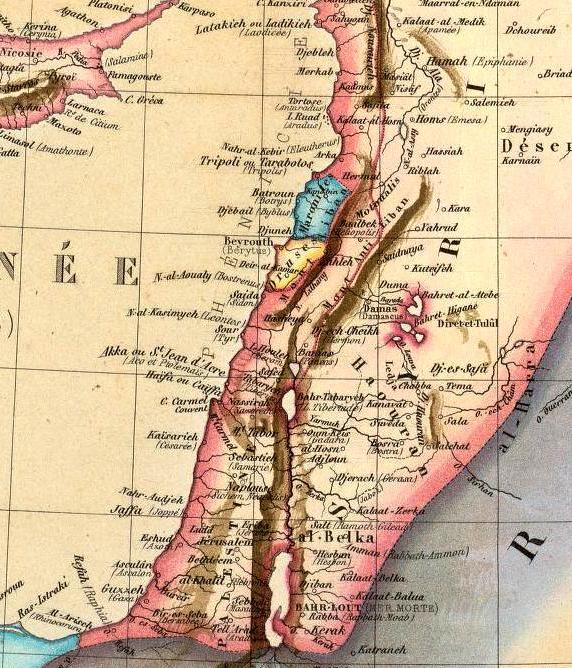
Published 1862

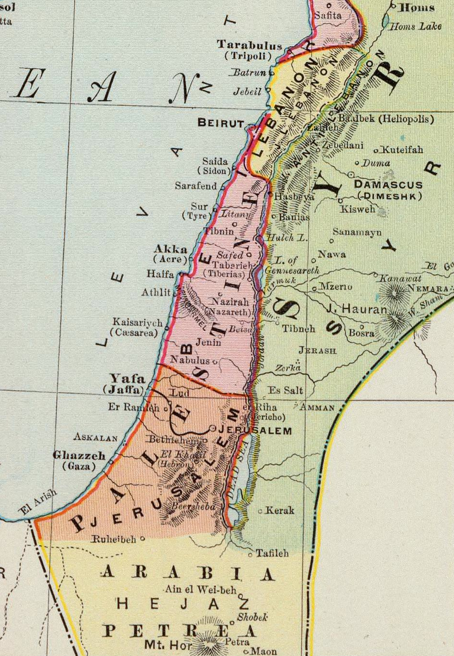
Published 1895

19th century maps of Ottoman Syria identifying the region of Palestine

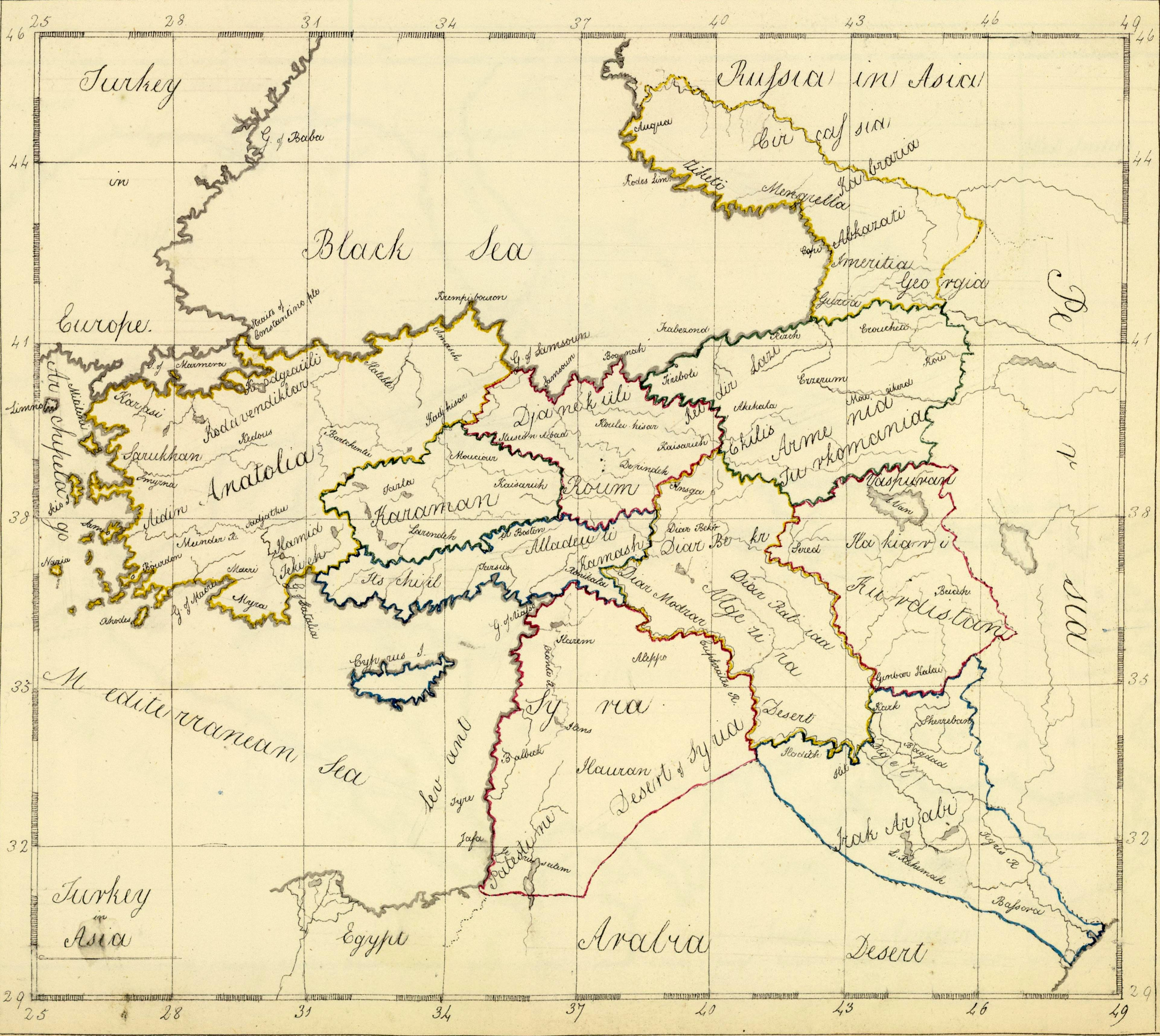
Turkey in Asia (By Frances Bowen. 1810)

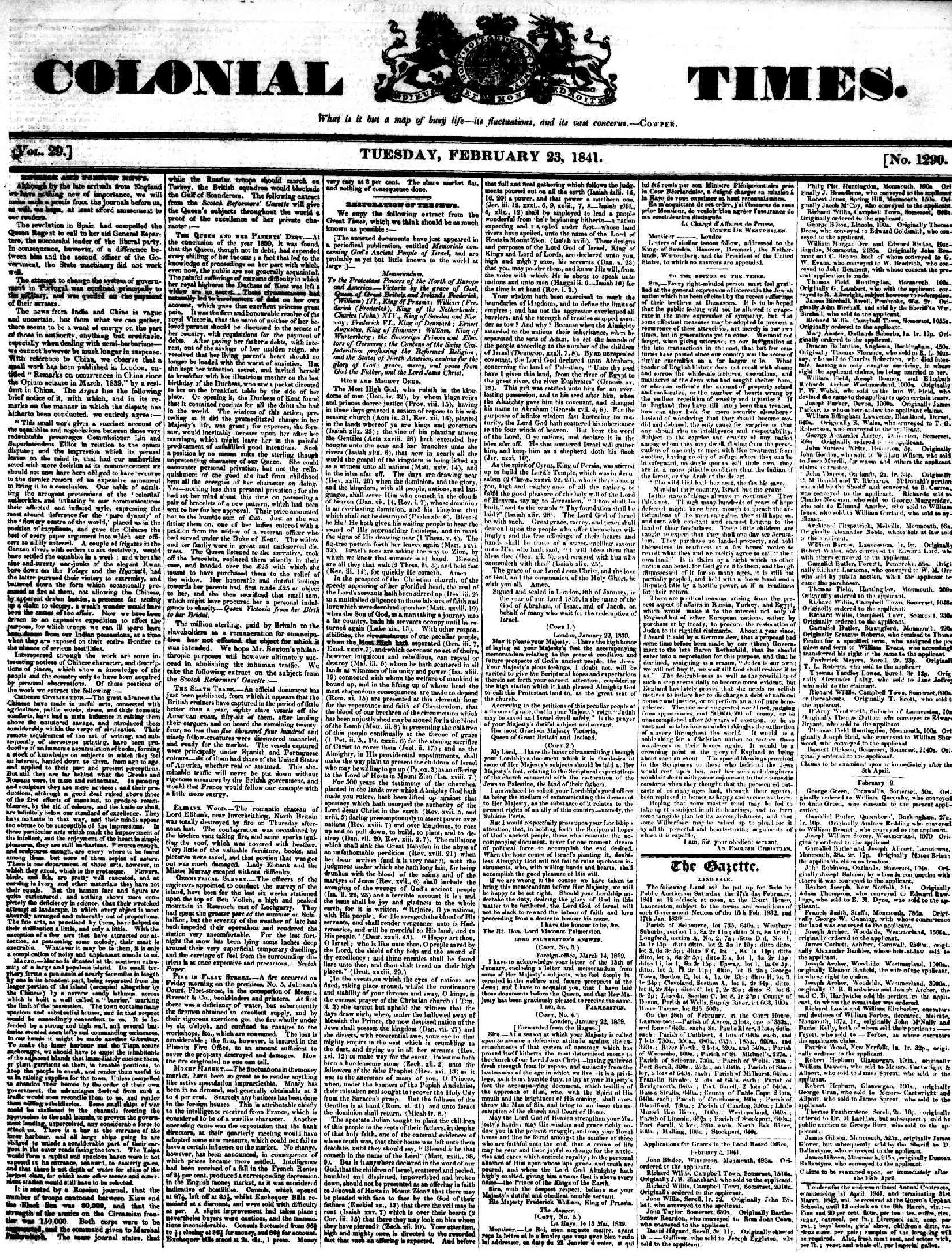
"Memorandum to the Protestant Powers of the North of Europe and America", published in the Colonial Times (Hobart, Tasmania, Australia), in 1841

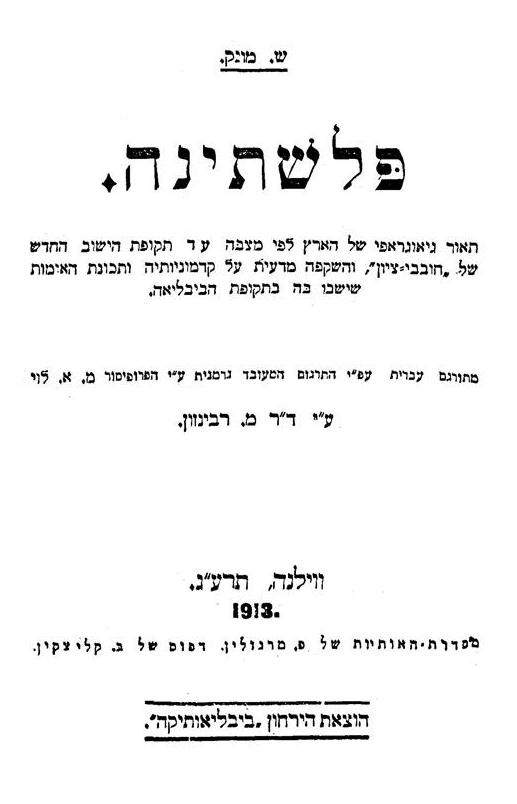
Palestine, by Salomon Munk, 1913 (First published 1845 in French)

- 1805: Palestine Association founded
- 1806: Lant Carpenter, An Introduction to the Geography of the New Testament: He brought out in 1806 a popular manual of New Testament geography. (Levant map, p. PA4, at Google Books)
- 1809: Reginald Heber, Palestine: a Poem
- 1811: François-René de Chateaubriand, Itinéraire de Paris à Jérusalem (Travels in Greece, Palestine, Egypt, and Barbary, during the years 1806 and 1807 [trans. 1812]): As to travellers of very recent date such as Muller, Vanzow, Korte, Bescheider, Mariti, Volney, Niebuhr, and Brown, they are almost totally silent respecting the holy places. The narrative of Deshayes (1621), who was sent to Palestine by Louis XIII, appears therefore to me the fittest to be followed.
- 1812: William Crotch, Palestine (an oratorio)
- 1819: George Paxton, Illustrations of the Holy Scriptures: In Three Parts.
  1. From the Geography of the East.
  2. From the Natural History of the East.
  3. From the Customs of Ancient and Modern Nations.

"Females of distinction in Palestine, and even in Mesopotamia, are not only beautiful and well-shaped, but, in consequence of being always kept from the rays of the sun, are very fair."

- 1819: Abraham Rees, Palestine & Syria, The Cyclopædia: Or, Universal Dictionary of Arts, Sciences, and Literature: Palestine, says Volney, is a district independent of every Pachalic. Sometimes it has governors of its own, who reside at Gaza under the title of Pachas; but it is usually, as at present, divided into three appanages, or Melkana, viz. Yafa, Loudd, and Gaza. The former belongs to the Walda or sultana mother. The captain Pacha has received the two others as a recompence for his services, and a reward for the head of Daher. He farms them to an aga, who resides at Ramla, and pays him two hundred and fifteen purses for them, viz. one hundred and eighty for Gaza and Ramla, and thirty-five for Loudd. [...] The ground is tilled by asses or cows, rarely by oxen. In districts like Palestine, exposed to the Arabs, the countryman must sow with a musket in his hand. The corn before it changes colour, is reaped, but concealed in caverns. The whole industry of the peasant is limited to a supply of his immediate wants; and to procure a little bread, a few onions, a wretched blue shirt, and a bit of woollen, much labour is not necessary.
- 1822: Conrad Malte-Brun, Universal Geography, Or, a Description of All the Parts of the World, on a New Plan: BOOK XXVII. TURKEY IN ASIA. PART II. Including Armenia Mesopotamia and Irac Arabi. The eastern provinces of the Turkish empire in Asia form three natural divisions: the region of Orontes and Libanus, or Syria and Palestine; that of the sources of the Euphrates and of the Tigris, or Armenia with Koordistan; finally, the region of Lower Euphrates, or Al-Djesira with Irac-Arabi, otherwise Mesopotamia, and Babylonia. We shall here connect the two divisions on the Euphrates, without confounding them. Syria will be described in a separate book. [...] Population. It would be vain to expect a near approximation to the truth in any conjectures which we might indulge respecting the population of a state in which registers and a regular census are unknown. Some writers estimate that of European Turkey at twenty-two, while others have reduced it to eight millions (Bruns. Magas. Géograph. I. cah. 1. p. 68–74. compared with Ludeck's Authentic Account of the Ottoman Empire. Etton's View and de Tott's Memoirs.), and both assign equally plausible grounds for their opinions. Respecting Asiatic Turkey, the uncertainty, if not still greater, is at least more generally acknowledged. Supposing the houses to be as thinly scattered as in the less populous parts of Spain, the population of all Turkey, in Europe, Asia, and Africa, may amount to 25 or 30 millions, of which one half belongs to Asia. Under the want of any thing like positive evidence, we shall not deviate far from probability in allowing to Anatolia, five millions; to Armenia, two; to Koordistan, one; to the pashâlics of Bagdat, Mosul, and Diarbekir, one and a half; and to Syria 1,800,000, or at most two millions.
- 1822: James Silk Buckingham, Travels in Palestine, through the countries of Bashan and Gilead, east of the river Jordan: incl. a visit to the cities of Geraza and Gamala, in the Decapolis: St. Jerome conceived it [Ramla] to be the Arimathea of the Scriptures; and Adrichomius, who entertained a similar opinion, traces its various names through all their changes, from Ramathaim and Ramah, as it is called in the Old Testament, to Ramatha or Armatha the seat of Samuel, as Josephus has it, and to the Arimathea of the New Testament, and the Ramla of the present day. The oriental geographers speak of this as the metropolis of Palestine, and every appearance of its ruins even now confirm the opinion of its having been once a considerable city. Its situation, as lying immediately in the high road from Jaffa to Jerusalem, made it necessarily a place of great resort; and from the fruitfulness of the country around it, it must have been equally important as a military station or a depôt for supplies, and as a magazine for the collection of such articles of commerce as were exported from the coast. (Buckingham 1822, p. 261 at Google Books)
- 1822: Robert Richardson, Travels Along the Mediterranean and Parts Adjacent: In Company with the Earl of Belmore, During the Years 1816-17-18: The white Veil covering the head and face, and falling over the shoulders, is worn by all the females in Syria and Palestine, except the Jewesses. [...] I never saw any of them with veils; and was informed that it is the general practice of the Jewesses in Jerusalem to go with their faces uncovered; they are the only females there who do so. Generally speaking, I think they are disposed to be rather of a plethoric habit; and the admirers of size and softness in the fair sex, will find as regularly well-built fatties, with double mouldings in the neck and chin, among the fair daughters of Jerusalem, as among the fairer daughters of England.
- 1823: Charles Leonard Irby, James Mangles, Travels in Egypt and Nubia, Syria, and Asia Minor; During the Years 1817 and 1818: Our attention was the more attracted by this [Necropolis of Petra] monument, as it presents, perhaps, the only existing example of pyramids so applied, though we read of them as placed in a similar manner on the summit of the tomb of the Maccabees, and of the Queen of Adiabaene, both in the neighbouring province of Palestine.
- 1823: Ernst Friedrich Karl Rosenmüller, "Geographie von Palästina." Handbuch der biblischen Altertumskunde: Biblische Geographie
- 1824: Robert Watt, Syria, Bibliotheca Britannica; Or, A General Index to British and Foreign Literature: SYRIA (S.), a province of Turkey, in Asia. ——HISTORY.

--DESCRIPTIONS. —1677. S. and Palestine. 284 z. —1783. The History of the Revolt of Ali Bey against the Ottoman Porte, including an Account of the Form of Government of Egypt; together with a Description of Grand Cairo, and of several celebrated places in Egypt, Palestine, and S. 623 v.
--GEOGRAPHY. —1532. S.æ, Palestinæ, Arabiæ, Ægypti, Schondiæ, Tabulæ Geographicæ. 992 x.
--TRAVELS. —1594. Peregrinatio in Egyptum, Arabiam, Palestinam, et S.m. 312 i. —1653. De Locis Antiochiam inter et Hierosolymam, necnon S.æ., et Phœniciæ, et Palestinæ, Gr. Lat. inter Leouis Allatii ???. 755 j. —1693. Journey through S., Mesopotamia, Palestine, and Egypt; in German. 792 e. —1704. Travels through Egypt, Arabia, Palestine, and S. 815 l. —1791. Travels through Cyprus, S., and Palestine. 644 g.

- 1827: Brockhaus Enzyklopädie, Allgemeine deutsche Real-Encyklopädie für die gebildeten Stände: Palästina (Falesthin), wegen der, den Nachkommen Abraham's gegebenen Verheißung, das gelobte Land genannt, nimmt die syrische Küste am mittel länd, Meere vom Libanon südwärts bis an die Grenzen Ägyptens. (Palestine (DIN 31635: Falasṭīn), called the "Promised Land" from the promise given to the descendants of Abraham, extends from the midlands to the coast, from Syria and Lebanon southward to the borders of Egypt.)
- 1827: Philippe Vandermaelen, Atlas universel de geographie physique: map: Syrie et Palestine {Asie 63}, at Princeton gisserver
- 1829: Anton von Prokesch-Osten Travel to the Holy Land (German: Reise ins Heilige Land): “In modern times, we most frequently use the term "Palestine," though we often mean by it only Canaan proper. The Bible does not contain this word. Philo uses it—noting its Syrian origin—in the aforementioned, narrower sense (*De Abrahamo*). Early commentators on Genesis often employ it in a broader sense, as do the Greeks and Romans. Medals from the reign of Vespasian likewise bear the inscription: *Palestina in potestatem P. R. redacta* ("Palestine brought under the power of the Roman people"). Early Christian and Arab writers also frequently make use of this term.”
- 1830: Josiah Conder, "Palestine." The Modern Traveller
- 1833: Heinrich Friedrich Pfannkuche: "In the writings of the Greeks and Romans, we need not look for indications of a very familiar acquaintance with the history and language of the Palestinian Jews, since they did not even vouchsafe their attention to the language and national writings of the more civilized nations of antiquity, such as the Carthaginians, Phoenicians, and Strabo, from whom we have quoted above the passages bearing upon our subject, is perhaps the only one who imparts this general information of the Syrians, (to whom the Palestinians also belonged,) that they and their neighbours spoke a cognate language, but he enters on no farther explanation as to the difference between their dialects"
- c. 1834: Neophytos, monk of the Church of the Holy Sepulchre: "The conquest of Ptolemais was celebrated in Jerusalem with illuminations, dancing and music, in every street and place in the city... The Moslems alone could not hide their sorrow and sullenness (although they danced with the rest), because they had a presentment that Egypt would use its power against them. They felt they could not continue to act as they wished, and that hereafter Jerusalem and all of Palestine would be reformed."
- 1835: Karl Georg von Raumer, Palästina
- 1835: Heinrich Berghaus, Asia, Sammlung von Denkschriften in Beziehung auf die Geo- und Hydrographie dieses Erdtheils; zur Erklärung und Erläuterung seines Karten-Atlas zusammengetragen: Map of Syria (No. 5 of Berghaus' Atlas of Asia): Karte von Syrien, den Manen Jacotin's und Burckhardt's gewidmet at the National Library of Israel.
- 1837: Lord Lindsay, Letters on Egypt, Edom and the Holy Land: "...we bade adieu to Jerusalem... It was our intention, after exploring Palestine (properly so called), to cross the Jordan, and visit Jerash"
- 1838: Humphry Davy, The collected works of Sir Humphry Davy: Palestine, a name supposed to be derived from the ancient Philistine coast, has been applied, from the earliest of modern ages, to the territory anciently assigned as the portion of the twelve tribes. The dimensions of this country do not correspond to its fame: it may be 150 miles in length north and south, and nearly as much in extreme breadth. It is bounded on the west by the Mediterranean; on the north it ranges along the southern skirts of Libanus; while on the east and south it passes into the Arabian desert, amid long ranges of rocky hills. Judea is a high country, rising by successive terraces from a shore that is, in many places bold and lofty. Its principal eminences, Carmel, Bashan, Tabor, do not ascend into bleak and rugged heights: they are covered with villages, rich pastures, and luxuriant woods; on their slopes are copious vineyards, and in the clefts of the rocks numerous bees, feeding on their aromatic plants, deposit their honey. Traces are even found of a cultivation, by artificial terraces, equal to that which prevails in the most improved parts of the East.
- 1838: Charles G. Addison, Damascus and Palmyra: a journey to the East: In the commencement of 1834, insurrections broke out in the mountains of Nablous, on Djebel Khalil, and in various parts of Palestine. Some of them, it is admitted, were promoted by the lawless and the disaffected to all settled government; others were fostered by the Sheikhs, who were discontented at their exactions from Christian pilgrims being put an end to, and many by the Bedouin Arabs and the mountaineers of Lebanon, who were discontented that the contributions they had been in the habit of imposing upon villages had been stopped.
- 1840: Ferdinand de Géramb, A pilgrimage to Palestine, Egypt and Syria: And, once more, that which most contributes to render Palestine a desert is the despotic government under which it groans, and the motto of which is destruction. It cannot be too often repeated —the Porte daily puts up this wretched country to auction : the pacha who offers most becomes its tyrant. Master of the life of the Arab as well as of his camel, of his horse as well as of his tent, he marks his passage by exactions alone. At sight of his satellites coming to levy the tribute, the population of whole villages abandon their ruined dwellings; and the poor oppressed inhabitants choose rather to die of want, in caverns of the rocks, than to expire under the bastinado of the soldier, who on his part, enraged at seeing his prey escape, revenges himself by cutting down the olive-tree of the fugitive whom he could not overtake.
- 1840: George Long, Palestine & Syria, The Penny Cyclopaedia of the Society for the Diffusion of Useful Knowledge: The modern history of Palestine is more conveniently included under SYRIA. The only portions of it which demand a separate notice have been treated of under Crusades. At present the country forms a part of Syria being included under the pashaliks of Damascus Akka and Tripoli and forming part of the viceroyalty of the pasha of Egypt. [...] In the most usual application of the word, Syria was the district bounded by the range of Amanus on the north, by the Mediterranean on the west, by the Euphrates and the Arabian Desert on the east and south, and by the 'river of Egypt' probably the river (El-Arish) on the south-west. In a still narrower sense it sometimes denoted the same district, with the exception of Phoenicia and Palestine, (Ptol., v. 16.) Herodotus, in speaking of Palestine, includes it in Syria, as a subordinate division: he calls it 'the Palestine Syria' (???, ii. 106).
- 1840: John Kitto, The Pictorial History of Palestine and The Holy Land including a Complete History Of The Jews,

Vol. I. Biblical History.
Vol. II. Biblical History, Continued. Natural History And Geography.

- 1841: John Kitto, Palestine: the Physical Geography and Natural History of the Holy Land, Illustrated with Woodcuts.
- 1841: Edward Robinson, Biblical Researches in Palestine, mount Sinai and Arabia Petrea: The great body of Christians in Palestine are of the Greek church ; but they are all native Arabs, and employ only the Arabic language in their worship.
- 1841: Charles Henry Churchill in correspondence with Sir Moses Montefiore: "Were the resources which you all possess steadily directed towards the regeneration of Syria and Palestine, there cannot be a doubt but that, under the blessing of the Most High, [the European Powers] would amply repay the undertaking, and that you would end by obtaining the sovereignty of at least Palestine."
- 1842: Adriano Balbi, System of universal geography, founded on the works of Malte-Burn and Balbi: Cities, Towns, &c., in Syria and Palestine. Santa Saba, 8 or 9 miles S.E. of Jerusalem, a monastery remarkable for its situation on a height, which rises precipitously several hundred feet from the deep valley of the brook Kedron. Beside it are numerous grottoes, which are said to have been inhabited by more than 10,000 monks at the epoch when St. Saba introduced the monastic life into Palestine. In continual danger from the wild Arabs, the convent appears like a fortress, with immensely strong and lofty towers.
- 1843: Alexander Keith, The Land of Israel, According to the Covenant with Abraham, with Isaac, and with Jacob: Palestine abounding in cultivated and flourishing regions, has several great cities which rival each other in their excellence, viz. Caesarea, Eleutheropolis, Neapolis, Askelon, and Gaza. The region beyond the Jordan, donominated Arabia, is rich in the variety of the merchandise of which it is full; it has besides other large towns the cities of Bostra, Gerasa, and Philadelphia, which the solidity of their walls renders most secure (Ammianus Marcellinus, lib. xiv. cap. viii.). [...] In Palestine, sesamum abounds, from which they procure oil, and dourra (a kind of pulse) as good as that of Egypt. Maize thrives in the light soil of Baalbec; and even rice is cultivated with success on the borders of the marshy countries of Havula. They have lately begun to cultivate sugar-canes in the gardens of Saide and of Beyrout, equal to those of the Delta. Indigo grows without cultivation on the banks of the Jordan, in the country of Bisan, and needs but care to improve the quality. Tobacco is now cultivated throughout all the mountains. As for trees, the olive of Provence grows at Antioch, and at Ramla, to the height of the beech. In the white mulberry-tree consists the wealth of the whole country of the Druses, by the beautiful silk which it produces; while the vine, supported by poles, or winding about the oaks, supplies grapes, which afford red and white wines equal to those of Bourdeaux. The water-melons of Jaffa are preferred before the very fine water melons of Broulas. Gaza produces dates like Mecca, and pomegranates like Algiers. Tripoli affords oranges like Malta. Beyrout, figs like Marseilles, and bananas like St Domingo. Aleppo has the (not) exclusive advantage of producing pistachios. And Damascus justly boasts of possessing all the fruits known in the provinces: its stony soil suits equally the apples of Normandy, the plums of Touraine, and the peaches of Paris. Twenty sorts of apricots aro enumerated there, the stone of one of which contains a kernel highly valued throughout Turkey. The cochineal plant, which grows on all that coast contains, perhaps, that precious insect in as high perfection as it is found in Mexico and St Domingo; and if we consider that the mountains of Yemen, which produce such excellent coffee are only a continuation of those of Syria, and that their soil and climate are almost the same, we shall be induced to believe that in Judea particularly, might be easily cultivated this valuable production of Arabia. "With these advantages of climate and soil, it is not surprising that Syria should always have been reckoned a most delicious country and that the Greeks and Romans esteemed it among the most beautiful of their provinces and equal even to Egypt" (Volney's Trav. vol. i. pp. 316–321. English translation).
- 1843: Origen Bacheler, Restoration and Conversion of the Jews: But ever since 1832, when Mehemet Ali took possession of Syria, there has been a remarkable flocking of the Jews to Palestine. The precise number of them at present in the Holy Land is estimated to amount to about 40,000.
- 1843: Stephen Olin, Travels in Egypt, Arabia Petræa, and the Holy land: European merchants could not live in the East, except under the protection of their own consuls. They never become subjects to the native rulers. If some civilized, Christian power would rescue Palestine, by treaty or force, from Mohammedan rule, and establish an enlightened, equitable, and stable government, then might it become a desirable residence for civilized men; but on no other condition could a residence there be endured by any but barbarians, content to be poor and tolerant from long habit of oppression and injustice. It fills me with surprise to see some of the best men of England labouring to promote the colonization of Jews in Palestine, and that under existing governments. The Jews are precisely the last people on earth fitted for such an enterprise, as they are a nation of traffickers, and know nothing of agriculture. Besides, the Jews of Europe and America are civilized and wealthy, and would not relish oppression and robbery, even in Palestine.
- 1843: Johann Friedrich Röhr, Röhr's Historico-geographical account of Palestine: Researches in Palestine: Napoleon Bonaparte, in 1799, gave new importance to Palestine. It was connected with his conquest of Egypt, and was undertaken nominally to repulse the Turkish army under Djezzar (Or the Butcher, so called by his subjects from his incredible cruelties. He died in 1808, apparently with a quiet conscience), the Pacha of St Jean d'Acre, by which he was threatened, and prevent it obstructing his intentions as to Egypt, but actually to get possession of the vast wealth of this Pacha, treasured up in Acre, and make this the foundation of other extensive projects as to the east.
- 1844: J. T. Bannister, A Survey of the Holy Land...: "Tacitus compares both the climate and the soil to those of Italy, and particularly specifies the palm and balsam-trees as productions which gave the country an advantage over his own. Justin confirms the account of Tacitus, respecting the exuberant produce of Palestine, its beautiful climate, its palm and fragrant balsam-trees."
- 1845: Encyclopædia Metropolitana, "Syria."
- 1845: Salomon Munk, Palestine, Description Géographique, Historique et Archéologique," in "L'Univers Pittoresque: Under the name Palestine, we comprehend the small country formerly inhabited by the Israelites, and which is today part of Acre and Damascus pachalics. It stretched between 31 and 33° N. latitude and between 32 and 35° degrees E. longitude, an area of about 1300 lieues carrées (League (unit)#France). Some zealous writers, to give the land of the Hebrews some political importance, have exaggerated the extent of Palestine; but we have an authority for us that one can not reject. St. Jerome, who had long traveled in this country, said in his letter to Dardanus (ep. 129) that the northern boundary to that of the southern, was a distance of 160 Roman miles, which is about 55 lieues (League (unit)#France). He paid homage to the truth despite his fears, as he said himself, of availing the Promised Land to pagan mockery, "Pudet dicere latitudinem terrae repromissionis, ne ethnicis occasionem blasphemandi dedisse uideamur."
- 1847: Walter McLeod, The geography of Palestine: MODERN DIVISIONS. 8. Palestine is now divided into pashalicks, the most important of which are Akka and Damascus. The country is under the dominion of the Turks, and is governed by Mehemet Pasha, who has been recently appointed the governor-general of Palestine.
- 1848: Thomas Wright (biographer), Early travels in Palestine: comprising the narratives of Arculf, Willibald, [and others]: Arculf, Willibald, Bernard, Sæwulf, Sigurd, Benjamin of Tudela, Sir John Mandeville, De la Brocquiere, and Maundrell.
- 1848: Carl Ritter, The Comparative Geography of Palestine and the Sinaitic Peninsula: CHAPTER II. REVIEW OF THE AUTHORITIES ON THE GEOGRAPHY OF PALESTINE. ...the lists of authorities given by Reland, Pococke, Meusel, Bellermann, Rosenmüller, Berghaus, Hammer-Purgstall, and more especially by von Raumer and Robinson. ...Others which we have from the English and the French ...John Kitto, Munk.
- 1848–49: Ottoman Archives: Ottoman map of Palestine, showing the term "filastin ülkesi" ("the land of Palestine") for the region between Ramle and Jaffa south of the Yarkon River
- 1849: William F. Lynch, Narrative of the United States' Expedition to the River Jordan and the Dead Sea: To the east of Bethlehem is the hill where the shepherds heard the annunciation of the birth of the Messiah; and in the plain below, the field where Ruth gleaned after the reapers. The country around was luxuriant with vegetation, and the yellow grain, even as we looked, was falling beneath the sickle. Variegated flint, chalk and limestone, without fossils, cropped out occasionally on the hill sides; but along the lower slopes, and in the bottom of the valley, were continuous groves, with a verdant carpet beneath them. It was the most rural and the loveliest spot we had seen in Palestine. From among many flowers we gathered a beautiful white one, free from all earthly taint, fit emblem of the purity of the infant Godhead.

⟨1850⟩

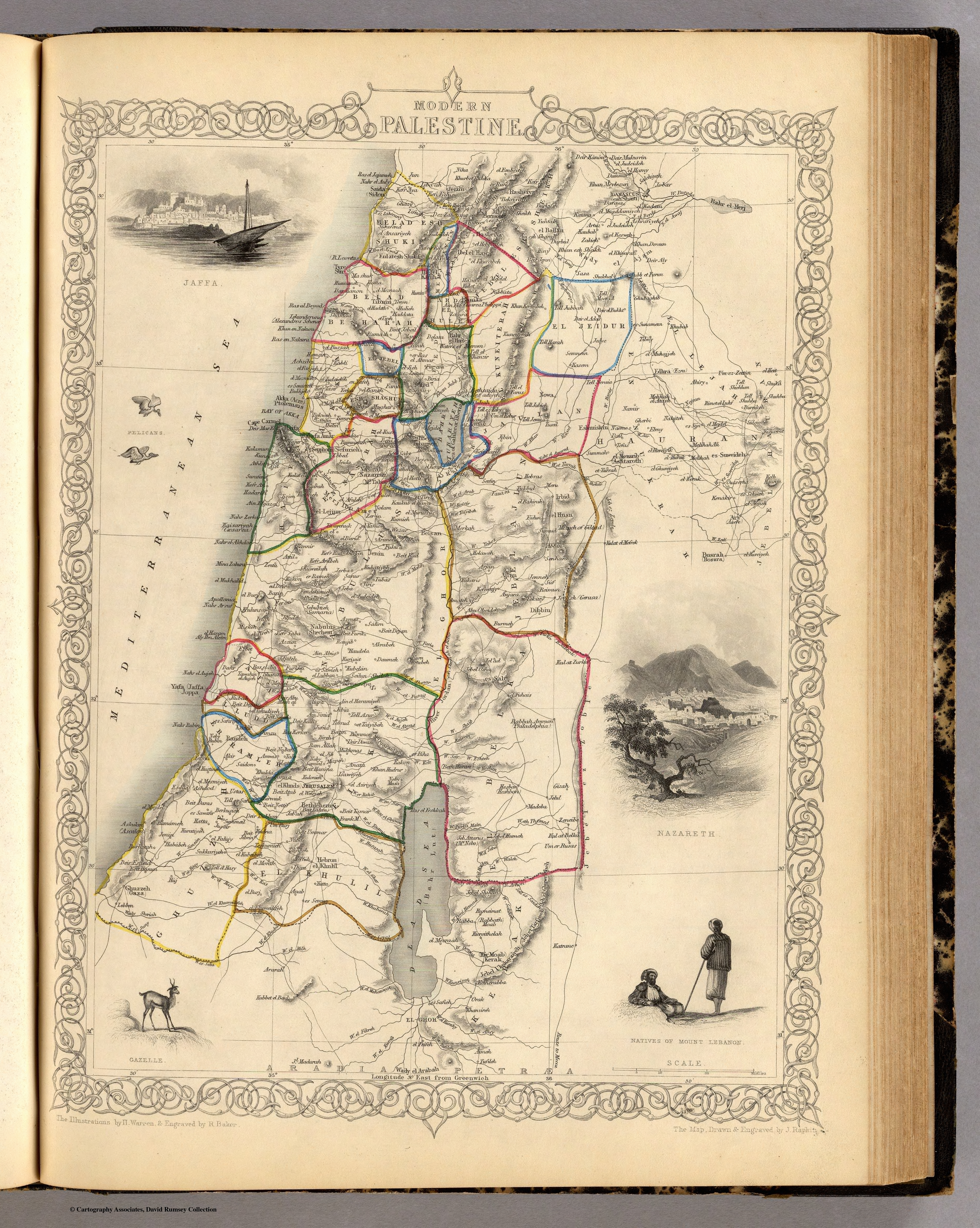
Map of Modern Palestine in 1851 with administrative subdivisions

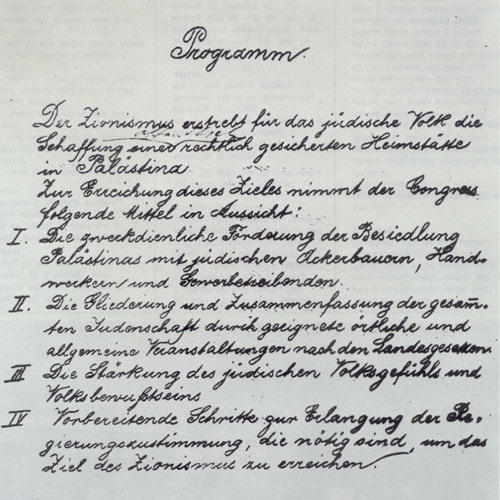
"Palestina" in the first line of the "Basel Program" written at the 1897 First Zionist Congress

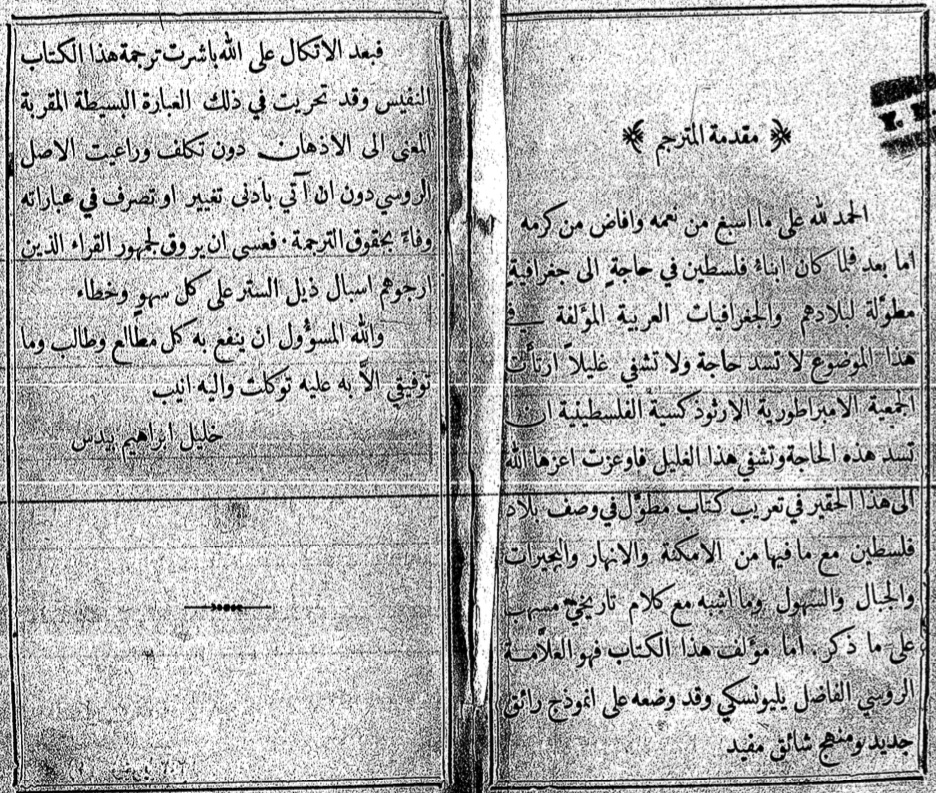
Khalil Beidas's 1898 use of the word "Palestinians" in the preface to his translation of Akim Olesnitsky's A Description of the Holy Land

- 1850: Yehoseph Schwarz, A Descriptive Geography and Brief Historical Sketch of Palestine: In the year 5592 (1832), Mahmud Ali, pacha of Alexandria in Egypt, declared himself independent of the Sultan of Constantinople. His son, Abraim Pacha, moved suddenly with a large force towards Palestine, and took without almost any resistance on the part of the adherents of the Sultan, Jaffa, Jerusalem, Nablus, and Chaifa, and placed Egyptian soldiers as garrisons in the same, and appeared next before Akko, which was occupied by Abd Alla Pacha, and besieged it a long time, and took it finally by storm, carrying away the Pacha as prisoner to Egypt. He gradually now occupied all Palestine, Syria, Arabia, and Nubia.
- 1856: James Redhouse, An English and Turkish dictionary: Regarded as the original and authoritative Ottoman-English dictionary, translates Holy Land as dari-filastin (House of Palestine)
- 1858: Josias Leslie Porter, A handbook for travellers in Syria and Palestine: The modern inhabitants of Southern Palestine may be divided into two classes—the Bedawin, or wandering tribes who dwell in tents, and the Fellahin, who reside in villages. [...] The plain of Akka is one of the richest in Palestine —producing alike the most luxuriant crops and the rankest weeds in the country. It is more moist than any of the other plains; and large sections of it become marshy during winter.
- 1859: Samuel Augustus Mitchell, map: Turkey in Asia and Geographicus – Arabia
- 1859: David Kay (FRGS), ed. Thomas Stewart Traill, Palestine, Encyclopædia Britannica: [Palestine] ...was finally subdued in 1517 by Selim I., the sultan of the Turks, under whom it has continued for more than 300 years. ...until the memorable invasion of Egypt by the French army in 1798. Bonaparte being apprised that preparations were making in the pashalic of Acre for attacking him in Egypt, resolved, according to his usual tactics, to anticipate the movements of his enemies. He accordingly marched across the desert which divides Egypt from Palestine, and invaded the country at the head of 10,000 troops. After taking several towns, and among the rest Jaffa, where he stained his character by the atrocious massacre of 4000 prisoners. (Kay 1859)
- 1859: Henry Stafford Osborn, Palestine, past and present: with biblical, literary, and scientific notices: The medals stamped with the impress of grapes, as we have shown upon the coin of Herod, (page 486,) the figure of the palm-tree so frequently seen on other medals stamped by Vespasian and Titus, and the medal of young Agrippa holding fruits, all indicate the excellence of the country. Notwithstanding all this, Mr. Gibbon remarks, speaking of Phoenicia and Palestine (Chap. i. p. 21), "The former of these was a narrow and rocky coast; the latter was a territory scarcely superior to Wales either in fertility or extent. ...M. Guizot supposes he based his remark upon a passage in Strabo (Bk. xvi. 1104), who speaks only of the country around Jerusalem which he says was unfruitful and arid for sixty stadia (probably five or six miles;) in other places giving excellent testimony to the fertility of Palestine. He says, "About Jericho is a forest of palm-trees, and the country for a hundred stadia is full of springs and well peopled."
- 1860: Josias Leslie Porter, ed. Thomas Stewart Traill, Syria, Encyclopædia Britannica: The modern inhabitants of Syria and Palestine are a mixed race, made up of the descendants of the ancient Syrians who occupied the country in the early days of Christianity and of the Arabians who came in with the armies of the khalifs and settled in the cities and villages. The number of the latter being comparatively small, the mixture of blood did not visibly change the type of the ancient people. This may be seen by comparing the Christians with the Muslems. The former are undoubtedly of pure Syrian descent, while the latter are more or less mixed, and yet there is no visible distinction between the two save what dress makes. (Porter 1860)
- 1860: 36th United States Congress, The Massacres in Syria: a Faithful Account of the Cruelties and Outrages Suffered by the Christians of Mount Lebanon, During the Late Persecutions in Syria: With a Succinct History of Mahometanism and the Rise of the Maronites, Druses ... and Other Oriental Sects ...: EARLY CHRISTIANITY IN SYRIA. I.—Hermits and Pilgrims. [...] II.—Origin of Monks. The hermits and anchorets, as they were called, were held in high esteem, and thousands of pilgrims, from all parts, sought their cells to obtain the benefit of their prayers. In the fourth century, the ancient lands of Syria and Palestine were full of such "holy men," and soon after they began to form societies and live together, as brethren, under oaths and regulations. This was the origin of religious houses or convents of monks; and the beginning of that monastic system which afterward extended throughout all Christendom. (36th U.S. Congress 1860, p. 11)
- 1865: William 'Corky' Norton, How I Got My Cork Legs, The St. James's Magazine: I was then at Malta, serving on board the [HMS] Powerful, 80-gun ship, Captain Charles Napier; ...This was in 1840 ...England, inspired by Lord Palmerston, had determined, in defiance of France, to put down the Pacha of Egypt, Mohammed Ali, and his equally miscreant son. ...I was consequently present at the bombardment of Beirût —Queen City of Palestine— at the landing, witnessed the panic-flight of the much-boasted Egyptians at the bare sight of our fellows, and was present at the fall of Acre. I never estimated very highly the glory of that Syrian campaign. What real resistance could a multitude of Egyptian soldiers offer to a well-organized British force? It signifies little to the wolves how numerous the sheep may be.
- 1865: William McClure Thomson, The land of promise: travels in modern Palestine [from The land and the Book].: From Samaria to Nablûs is two hours' easy riding; first south, over the shoulder of the mountain, and then east ward, up the lovely vale of Nablûs. Nothing in Palestine surpasses it in fertility and natural beauty, and this is mainly due to the fine mill-stream which flows through it. The whole country is thickly studded with villages; the plains clothed with grass or grain; and the rounded hills with orchards of olive, fig, pomegranate, and other trees.
- 1867: Titus Tobler, Bibliographica Geographica Palaestinae.
- 1871: John Tillotson, Palestine Its Holy Sites and Sacred Story
- 1872–1917: The Mutasarrifate of Jerusalem was commonly referred to at the time as "Palestine." In the 1880s the Ottoman government briefly considered to officially rename it.
- 1873: William Smith, Dictionary of Greek and Roman Geography: 2: Iabadius-Zymethus: PALAESTINA (Παλαιστίνη : Eth. (Παλαιστίνόs), the most commonly received and classical name for the country, otherwise called the Land of Canaan, Judaea, the Holy Land, &c. This name has the authority of the prophet lsaiah, among the sacred writers: and was received by the earliest secular historians. Herodotus calls the Hebrews Syrians of Palestine; and states that the sea-border of Syria, inhabited, according to him by Phoenicians from the Red Sea, was called Palaestina as far as Egypt (vii. 89). He elsewhere places Syria Palaestina between Phoenice and Egypt; Tyre and Sidon in Phoenice: Ascalon, Cadytis Ienysus in Palaestina Syriae; elsewhere he places Cadytis and Azotus simply in Syria (iv. 39, iii. 5, ii. 116, 157, i. 105, iii. 5). [...] The most valuable contributions to the ancient geography of Palestine are those of Eusebius and his commentator S. Jerome in the Onomasticon, composed by the former, and translated, with important additions and corrections, by the latter who has also interspersed in his commentaries and letters numerous geographical notices of extreme value. They are not, however, of such a character as to be available under this general article, but are fully cited under the names of the towns, &c. (See Reland, Palaest. lib. ii. cap. 12, pp. 479, &c.)
- 1875: Karl Baedeker, Palaestina und Syrien: Handbuch für Reisende: VI. Die Araber nennen Syrien, worunter sie auch Palästina (Filistin) begreifen, "esch-Schäm." Dieser Name bezeichnet eigentlich das 'links' gelegene Land, im Gegensatz zu el-Yemen, das 'rechts' gelegene Land, (Südarabien). Bei den Türken hört man den Namen Süristän. Die Türken theilten Syrien in fünf Gouvernements (Paschaliks): Aleppo, Tripolis, Damascus, Saida (später Akka) und Palästina. Diese Eintheilung hat aber im Laufe der Jahrhunderte viele Veränderungen erlitten. Bis vor Kurzem war Syrien nur in zwei Grossgouvernements (wiläyet) mit den Hauptstädten Damascus und Aleppo getheilt. In neuester Zeit ist Jerusalem ebenfalls Sitz eines von der Pforte direct abhängigen Centrai-Gouverneurs (wäli) geworden und zwar in Folge des Versuches, die turbulenten Stämme jenseit des Jordan auf die Dauer zu pacificiren.
- 1875: Isabel Burton, The Inner Life of Syria, Palestine, and the Holy Land: From My Private Journal: We rode to Dayr el Kamar, a large village in the territory of El Manásíf. Then we went to B'teddin, now the palace of Franco Pasha, Governor of the Lebanon. ...he meets every case with liberality and civilization; he was a religious man, and Allah and the Sultan were his only thoughts. Everything he did for the natives' good, he told them that it came from his Master and theirs, so that "May Allah prolong the days of our Sultan" was ever in the people's mouth. It would have been happy if a few more Franco Pashas were distributed about Syria and Palestine.
- 1876: Thomas Cook, Cook's Tourists' Handbook for Palestine and Syria: Sir Moses Montefiore's mission has been to assist the Jews, not by indiscriminate charity, but by giving them means and scope for labour. In January 1875, being in the 91st year of his age, he resigned his position as President of the Board of Deputies of British Jews, and a testimonial to him having been resolved upon, he requested it might take the form of a scheme for improving the condition of the Jews in Palestine generally, and Jerusalem particularly. About £11,000 only has been as yet contributed to the fund, although the amount anticipated was £200,000. The reason of the smallness of the contributions was that a rumour went abroad that the scheme was only to continue idle Jews in idleness.
- 1879: Nu'man ibn 'Abdu al-Qasatli: al-Rawda al-Numaniyya in the travelogue to Palestine and some Syrian Towns
- 1880s: The Ottoman government issues a number of decrees to foreign governments, intended to limit Zionist immigration, land purchases and settlement. The decrees refer to "Palestine," but the term is not defined.
- 1889: Albrecht Socin (University of Tubingen), "Palestine." The Encyclopædia Britannica: "Lists based on information collected by the Turkish Government ...for the sanjak of Jerusalem (with the districts Jerusalem, Yáfá, Hebron), 276 places with about 24,000 houses (families); for the sanjak Belká (with the districts of Nábulus Jennin Ajlun and Es-Salt), 317 places and 18,984 houses; for the sanjak Akka (Acre) (with the districts Akka, Haifa, and Safed), 160 places with 11,023 houses, —making a total of 753 places with 54,237 houses. Reckoning five persons per house, this gives a population of 271,185, exclusive of the small number of Bedouins. Detailed statistics there are none as regards the relative strength of the Bedouin element and the peasantry, the numerical representation of the different religions, or any matter of this sort."
- 1890: Reinhold Röhricht, Bibliotheca Geographica Palestine, from the year A.D. 333 to A.D. 1878: among the books on Palestine. Bibliotheca Geographica Palestinae, (Berlin, 1890). Bibliotheca Geographica Palestine. Chronologisches Verzeichniss der auf die Geographic des heiligen Landes beziiglichen Literatur von 333 bis 1878 und Versuch einer Cartographic. Herausgegeben von Reinhold Rohricht. (Berlin: H. Reuther's Verlagsbuchhandlung, 1890.) The book professes to give a list of all the books relating to the geography of Palestine from the year 333 to 1878 and also a chronological list of maps relating to Palestine. (The Church Quarterly Review 1891, p.259, at Google Books) (Bibliotheca Geographica Palestinae, (Berlin, 1890), at openlibrary.org)
- 1897: First Zionist Congress: the Basel program sets out the goals of the Zionist movement: "Zionism aims at establishing for the Jewish people a publicly and legally assured home in Palestine"
- 1898: Khalil Beidas, his preface to his translation of Akim Olesnitsky's A Description of the Holy Land: "the people of Palestine were in need of a geography book about their country... the Palestinian peasant waits impatiently for winter to come, for the season's rain to moisten his fossilized fields." It has been proposed that this represents the first instance in modern history where the term 'Palestinian' or 'Filastini' appears in Arabic.

⟨1900⟩

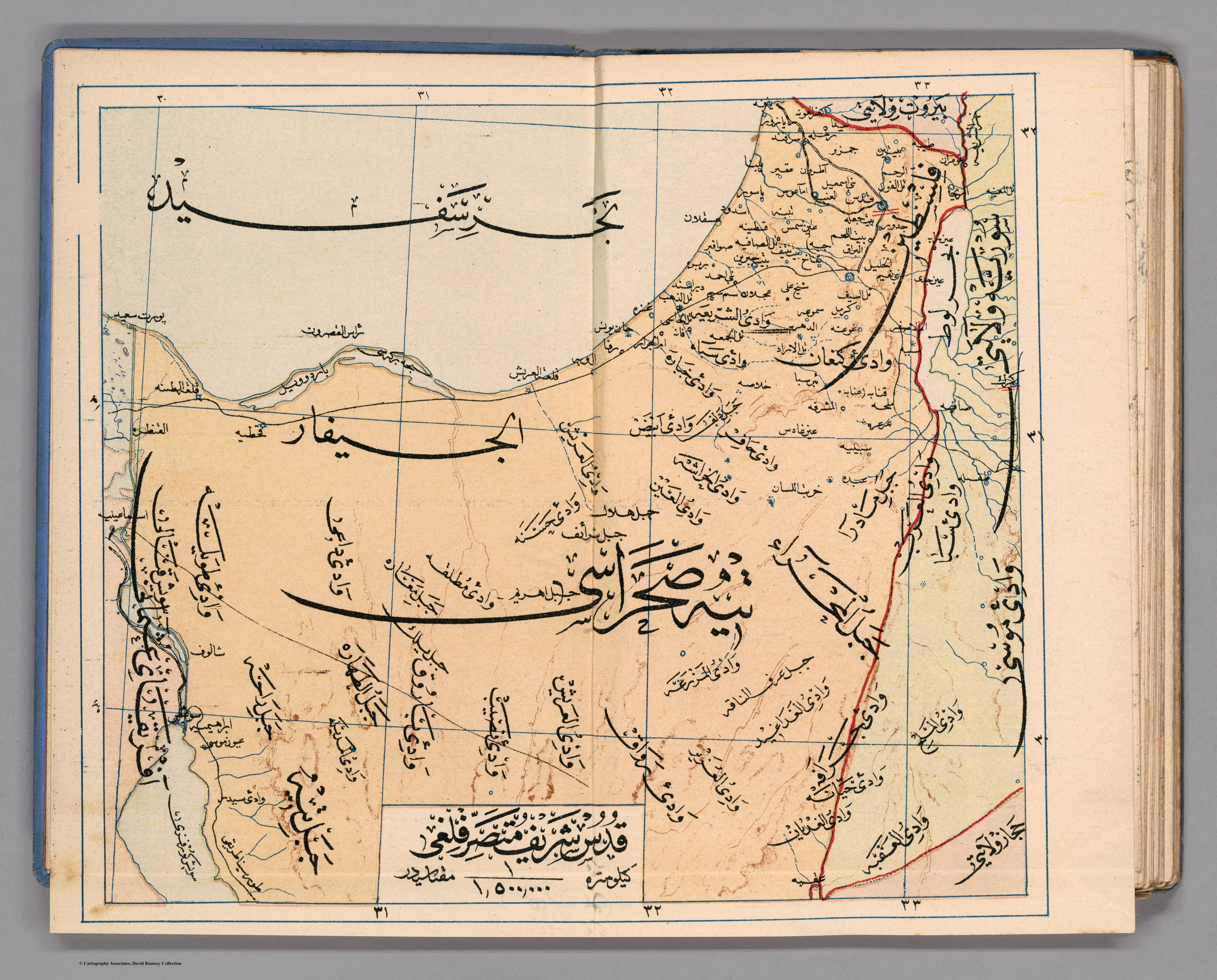
Jerusalem Mutasarrifate, 1907: on the south, shows the 1860 borders between Ottoman Syria and the Khedivate of Egypt, although the border was moved to the current Israel—Egypt border in 1906

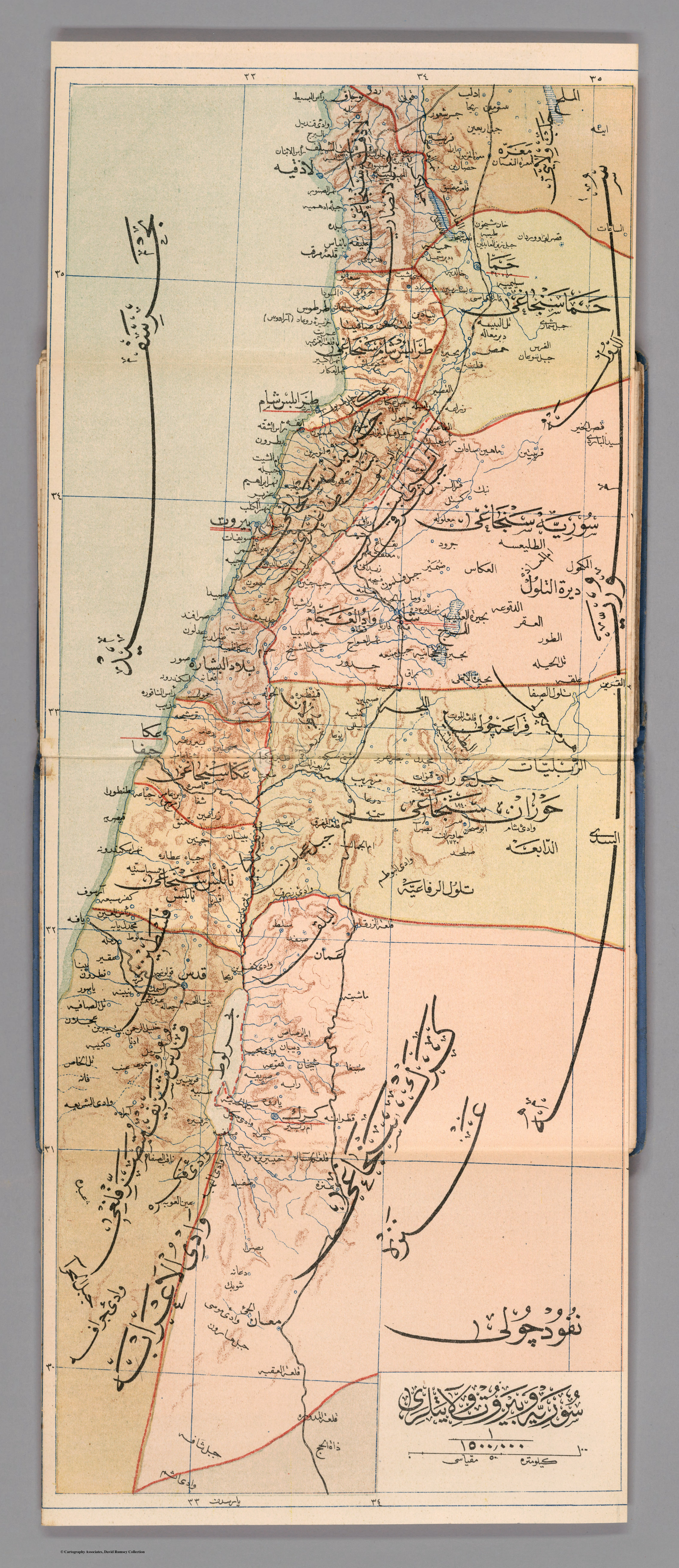
Syria and Beirut Vilayets, 1907

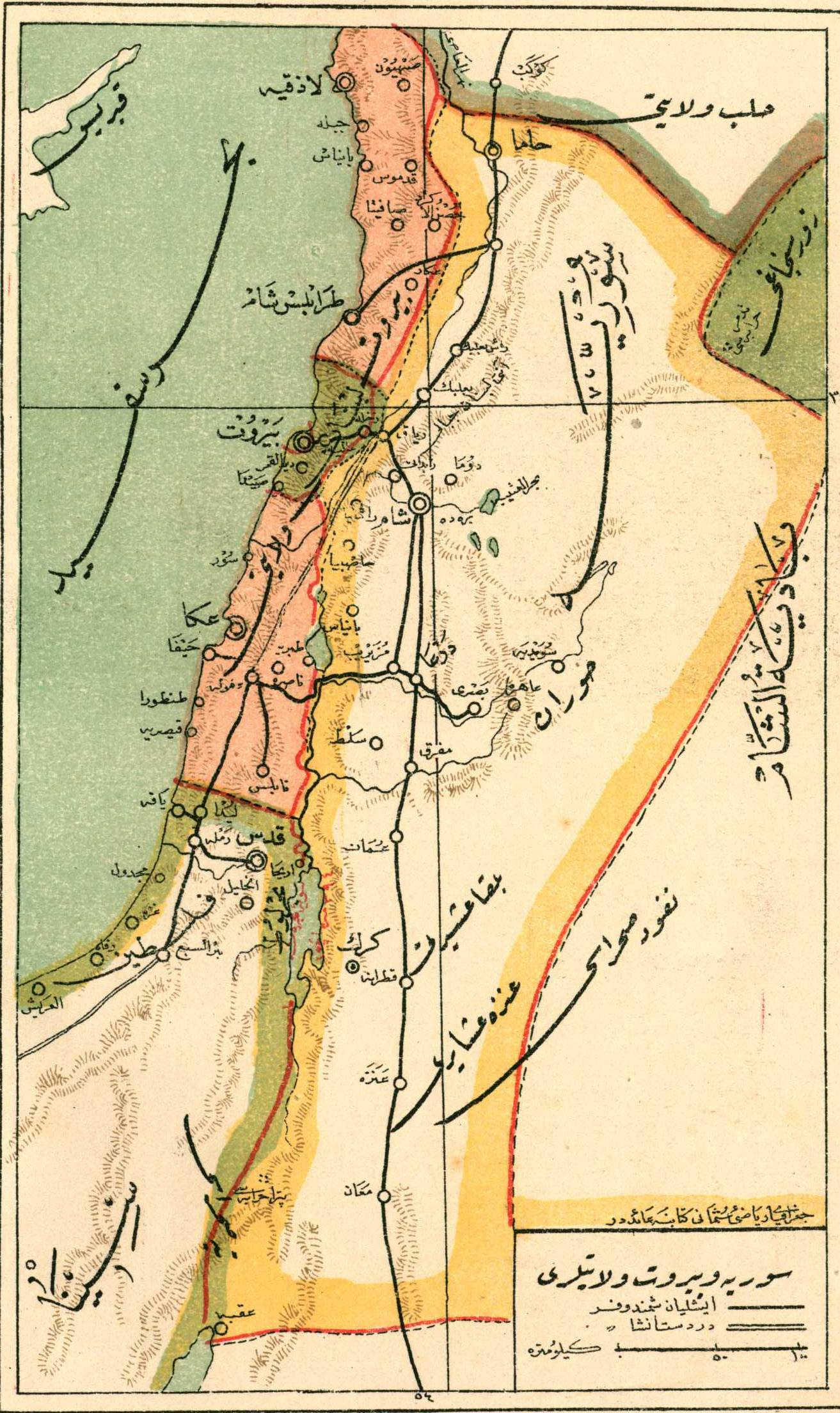
Syria and Beirut Vilayets, 1913

Late Ottoman maps showing the "Quds Al-Sharif Mutasarrifate". The area north of the Negev Desert is labelled "Filastin" (Palestine).

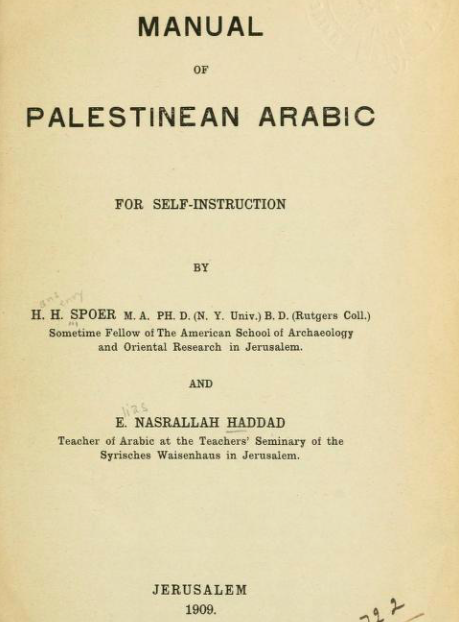
Manual of Palestinean Arabic, for self-instruction 1909

- c. 1900–10: Ottoman Governors: According to Haim Gerber "The remnants of the correspondence of the Ottoman governors with their superiors in the first decade of the twentieth century quite often relate to the Zionist question and the resistance to it among local inhabitants. The country is referred to throughout as Palestine."
- 1900: J. M. Robertson, Christianity and Mythology: Long before Biblical Judaism was known, the people of Palestine shared in the universal rituals of the primeval cults of sun and moon, Nature and symbol; and the successive waves of conquest, physical and mystical, have only transformed the primordial hallucination.
- 1902: Salim Qub'ayn and Najib Nassar, "A Palestinian describes Palestinian towns."
- 1902: The Anglo-Palestine bank: A subsidiary of the Bank Leumi, the financial instrument of the Zionist Organization
- 1911: Falastin newspaper was founded in Jaffa by Palestinian Christians.
- 1911: David George Hogarth, "Syria." Encyclopædia Britannica: "Population.—The actual population of Syria is over 3,000,000 spread over a superficial area of about 600,000 sq. m., i.e. about 5 1/2 persons to the square mile. But this poor average is largely accounted for by the inclusion of the almost uninhabited northern steppe land and those parts of Syria, which are settled show a much higher rate. Phoenicia and the Lebanon have the densest population, over 70 to the square mile, while Palestine, the north part of the western plateau east of Jordan, the oases of Damascus and Aleppo, the Orontes valley, and parts of Commagene, are well peopled."
- 1913: Al-Karmil (newspaper): "We hoped that they [the Ottoman Party for Administrative Decentralization] would rid us of Zionist threats and dangers. We comprised a group of people who had hoped the best for their leaders. This team possessed tremendous power; not to ignore that Palestine, their country, was part of the Ottoman Empire."
- c. 1913: Ruhi Khalidi, Zionism or the Zionist Question, according to Haim Gerber "It is noteworthy that whenever the name of the country appears, it is always Palestine, never southern Syria or anything else."
- 1914: Four days after Britain's declaration of war on the Ottoman Empire at a British Cabinet meeting on 9 November 1914, David Lloyd George, Chancellor of the Exchequer, "referred to the ultimate destiny of Palestine."
- 1915: VIII Corps (Ottoman Empire), Filastin Risalesi ("Palestine Document"), an Ottoman army country survey which formally identified Palestine as including the sanjaqs of Akka (the Galilee), the Sanjaq of Nablus, and the Sanjaq of Jerusalem (Kudus Sherif).

==== Formation of the British Mandate ====
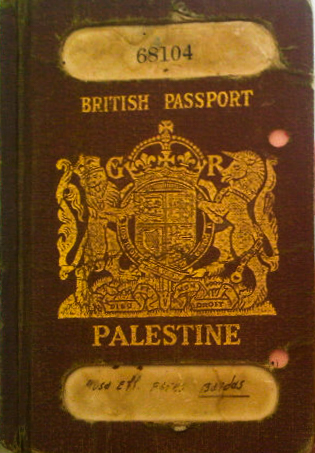
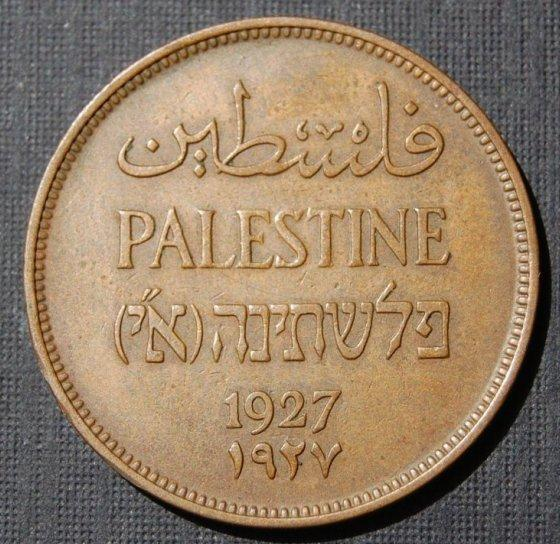
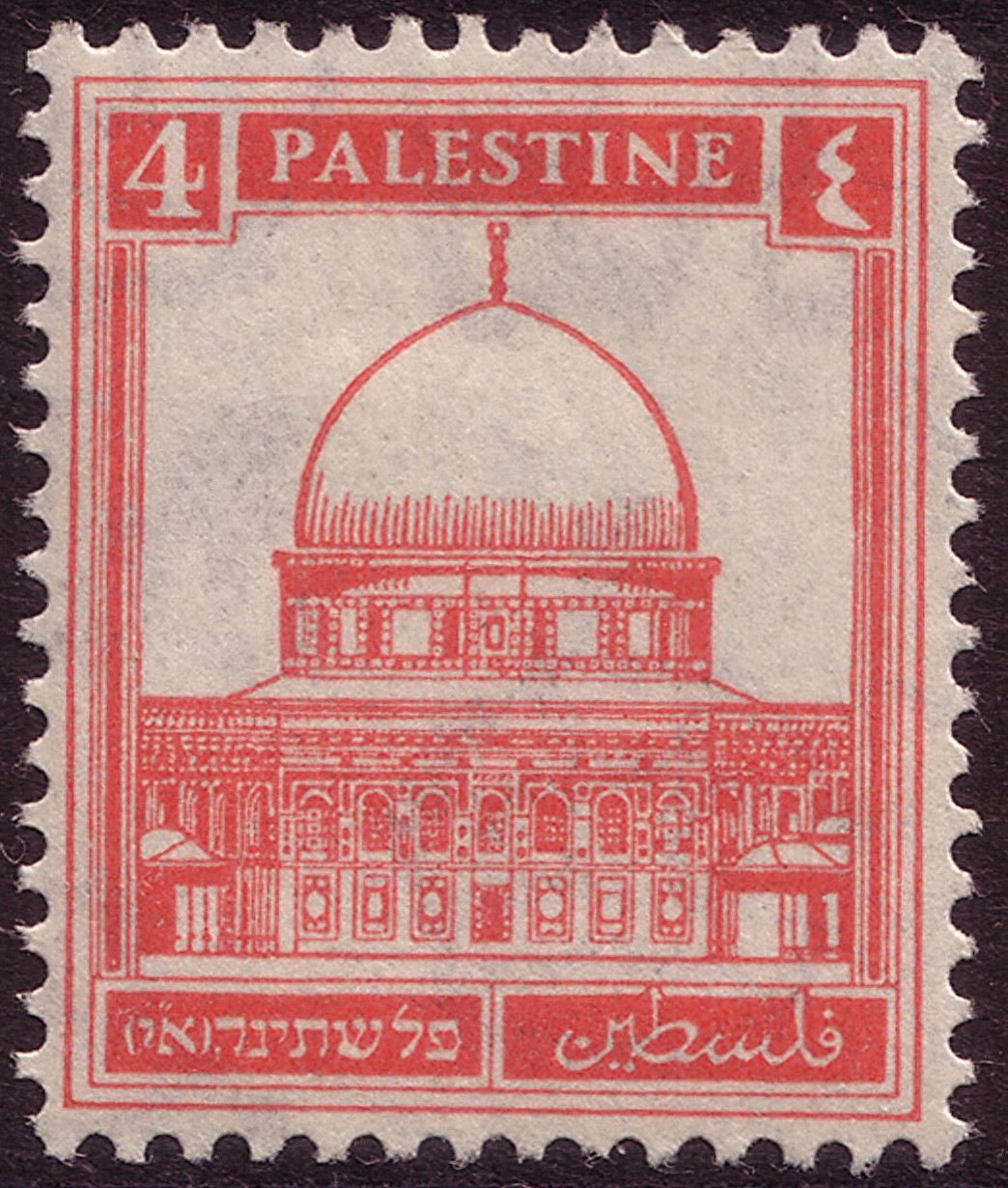
Passport, coin and stamp from Mandatory Palestine. When written in English all show "Palestine", with the latter two also showing Arabic: فلسطين Filasţīn and Hebrew: פָּלֶשְׂתִּינָה (א"י) Palestína (EY)
- 1918: House of Commons of the United Kingdom: Minutes: "Major Earl Winterton asked the Secretary of State for Foreign Affairs what facilities have been given to the Palestinian and Syrian political leaders now in Egypt to visit Palestine?" An early use of the word Palestinian in British politics, which was used often in following years in the British government
- 1919: Zionist Organization, Statement on Palestine at the Paris Peace Conference: "The boundaries of Palestine shall follow the general lines set out below: Starting on the North at a point on the Mediterranean Sea in the vicinity south of Sidon and following the watersheds of the foothills of the Lebanon as far as Jisr El-Karaon thence to El-Bire, following the dividing line between the two basins of the Wadi El-Korn and the Wadi Et-Teim, thence in a southerly direction following the dividing line between the Eastern and Western slopes of the Hermon, to the vicinity west of Beit Jenn, then eastward following the northern watersheds of the Nahr Mughaniye close to and west of the Hedjaz Railway. In the east a line close to and west of the Hedjaz Railway terminating in the Gulf of Akaba. In the south a frontier to be agreed upon with the Egyptian Government. In the west the Mediterranean Sea."
- 1919: Syrian National Congress: "We ask that there be no separation of the southern part of Syria, known as Palestine, nor of the littoral western zone, which includes Lebanon, from the Syrian country."
- 1920: Franco-British boundary agreement – the framework agreement in which the borders of the Mandate of Palestine were established, being finally approved on 7 March 1923
- 1920: Herbert Samuel during an Advisory Council meeting: "After some further discussion on the part of several members, [Samuel] said that when he had to decide the wording for the stamps, he was aware that there was no other name in the Hebrew language for this land except 'Eretz-Israel'. At the same time he thought that if 'Eretz-Israel' only were used, it might not be regarded by the outside world as a correct rendering of the word 'Palestine,' and in the case of passports or certificates of nationality, it might perhaps give rise to difficulties, so it was decided to print 'Palestine' in Hebrew letters and to add after it the letters 'Aleph' 'Yod,' which constitute a recognised abbreviation of the Hebrew name. [Samuel] still thought that this was a good compromise. Dr. Salem wanted to omit 'Aleph' 'Yod' and Mr. Yellin wanted to omit 'Palestine'. The right solution would be to retain both."
- 1921: Syrian-Palestinian Congress
- 1923: British Mandate for Palestine is ratified

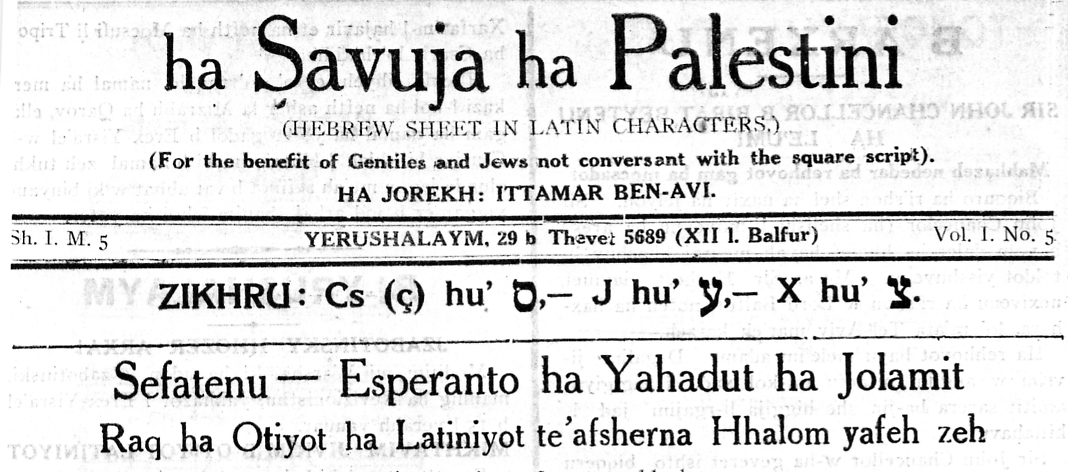
Title of the romanized Hebrew newspaper ha Savuja ha Palestini, published by Itamar Ben-Avi, 1929

- 1926: Permanent Mandates Commission: "M. Palacios [Spanish representative], returning to the concrete questions of a general character of which the Arabs complained, recalled those concerning the national title, the national hymn and the flag.... As regards the first point, the Arabs claimed that it was not in conformity with Article 22 of the Mandate to print the initials and even the words "Eretz Israel" after the name "Palestine" while refusing the Arabs the title "Surial Janonbiah" ("Southern Syria"). The British Government had not accepted the use of this Arab title, but gave the place of honour to the Hebrew word used for 2,000 years and decided that the official name in Hebrew was "Palestina" followed by the initials signifying "Aleph Jod," the regular Hebrew name. Was the question still under discussion and could the accredited representative give the Commission any further information? Colonel Symes explained that the country was described as "Palestine" by Europeans and as "Falestin" by the Arabs. The Hebrew name for the country was the designation "Land of Israel," and the Government, to meet Jewish wishes, had agreed that the word "Palestine" in Hebrew characters should be followed in all official documents by the initials which stood for that designation. As a set-off to this, certain of the Arab politicians suggested that the country should be called "Southern Syria" in order to emphasise its close relation with another Arab State."
- 1936: Peel Commission Report: "[Jewish nationalism] claims, for example, that, though Palestine is not an Arab word and might therefore fairly serve for Jews as well as Arabs, Eretz Israel (Land of Israel) should be also accepted as the official translation of "Palestine," and protests that the printing of the Hebrew initials "E. I." after "Palestine" on every stamp and coin is not enough."

== Biblical references ==
The five books of the Pentateuch / Torah include a total of 10 references, including:

- Genesis 10:14: (first reference) "And Pathrusim, and Casluhim, (out of whom came Philistim,) and Caphtorim."
- Genesis 21:32–34: "Thus they made a covenant at Beersheba: then Abimelech rose up, and Phichol the chief captain of his host, and they returned into the land of the Philistines. And Abraham planted a grove in Beersheba, and called there on the name of the LORD, the everlasting God. And Abraham sojourned in the Philistines' land many days."
- Exodus 13:17: "And it came to pass, when Pharaoh had let the people go, that God led them not through the way of the land of the Philistines, although that was near; for God said, Lest peradventure the people repent when they see war, and they return to Egypt"
- Exodus 23:31: "And I will set thy bounds from the Red sea even unto the sea of the Philistines, and from the desert unto the river: for I will deliver the inhabitants of the land into your hand; and thou shalt drive them out before thee."

The Historical books (see Deuteronomistic history) include over 250 references, almost 200 of which are in the Book of Judges and the Books of Samuel, including:

- Joshua 13:1–3: "Now Joshua was old and stricken in years; and the LORD said unto him, Thou art old and stricken in years, and there remaineth yet very much land to be possessed. This is the land that yet remaineth: all the borders of the Philistines, and all Geshuri, from Sihor, which is before Egypt, even unto the borders of Ekron northward, which is counted to the Canaanite: five lords of the Philistines; the Gazathites, and the Ashdothites, the Eshkalonites, the Gittites, and the Ekronites; also the Avites"
- 1Kings 4:21: "And Solomon reigned over all kingdoms from the river unto the land of the Philistines, and unto the border of Egypt: they brought presents, and served Solomon all the days of his life."

Wisdom books include only 6 references, all in the Psalms, including:

- Psalm 87:4: "I will make mention of Rahab and Babylon to them that know me: behold Philistia, and Tyre, with Ethiopia; this man was born there."

Books of the Major prophets and Minor prophets include around 20 references, including:

- Zephaniah 2:5: "Woe unto the inhabitants of the sea coast, the nation of the Cherethites! the word of the LORD is against you; O Canaan, the land of the Philistines, I will even destroy thee, that there shall be no inhabitant."
- Amos 9:7: "Are ye not as children of the Ethiopians unto me, O children of Israel? saith the LORD. Have not I brought up Israel out of the land of Egypt? and the Philistines from Caphtor, and the Syrians from Kir?"

== See also ==
- Cartography of Palestine
- Travelogues of Palestine
- Names of Jerusalem
- Names of the Levant
- Place names of Palestine
- Roman Empire
- Judaea (Roman province)
- Geography and cartography in the medieval Islamic world
- Timeline of the Palestine region

== Notes ==
a. †Coele-Syria

During the Roman period "Palestine" was not the only geographical term for the region. For example, Strabo, in his description of Jerusalem and Judea, uses the term "Coele-Syria" ("all Syria"), and Pliny (as above) uses both terms. Pliny (Naturalis Historia 5.74, 77) and Strabo (16.2.16.754) do draw a distinction between the Decapolis and Coele-Syria. Josephus (Antiquities 13.355-356, 392; 14.79, 16.275; and War 1.103-104, 155), Philo and Ptolemy tend to use Coele-Syria for the Decapolis.

Nomenclatures of Syria given by Strabo
Primary	Cœlê-Syria & Seleucis-Syria & Phœnicia &c. &c.	Cœlê-Syria ≠ Cœlo-Syrians
Alternate	Cœlo-Syrians & Syrians & Phœnicians	Similar to nomenclature given by Herodotus

Greek writers of classical antiquity used the term Palestine to refer to the region of Coele-Syria, such as Polemon of Athens and Pausanias. Description of Greece: (1) "Hard by is a sanctuary of the Heavenly Aphrodite; the first men to establish her cult were the Assyrians, after the Assyrians the Paphians of Cyprus and the Phoenicians who live at Ascalon in Palestine; the Phoenicians taught her worship to the people of Cythera."; (2) "In front of the sanctuary grow palm-trees, the fruit of which, though not wholly edible like the dates of Palestine, yet are riper than those of Ionia.";

b. †Syria Palaestina

Coinciding with either the precursors (129–130) or the end (135–136) of the Bar Kochba revolt, the name Syria Palestina was used officially for the entire region that had formerly included Iudaea Province. The precise date is not certain. The assertion of some scholars that the name change was intended "to suppress Jewish national feelings," "to complete the dissociation with Judaea," or "may also reflect Hadrian's decided opinions about Jews," is disputed.

c. †Achaemenid Empire

Catalogues of Satrapies of the Achaemenid empire.
- Darius' Behistun inscription
- Histories of the Greek researcher Herodotus

the tribute list
the list of Persian armed forces

- the inscription on Darius' tomb at Naqš-i Rustam
- the Daiva inscription of Xerxes.
There are many satrapies mentioned in a book about Alexander the Great, the Anabasis by Arrian of Nicomedia.

Darius, Behistun (521 BCE)	Herodotus, Histories 3.90-94 (Tribute list)	Darius, Naqš-i Rustam (492 BCE?)	Herodotus, Histories 7.61-96 (Army list) (480/481 BCE)	Xerxes, XPh (daiva inscription)	Arrian, Anabasis (on history of the 4th century BCE)
Cappadocia	district III/c: Syrians, Phrygians	Cappadocia	Syrians (= Cappadocians)	Cappadocia	Cappadocia
	district IV: Cilicians		Cilicia		Cilicia
Beyond the river	district V: Phoenicia; Palestina; Cyprus		Phoenicia; Palestina; Cyprus		Syria; Palestina
Egypt	district VI/a: Egypt	Egypt	Egypt	Egypt	Egypt

== Bibliography ==
- Beška, Emanuel; Foster, Zachary (2021). "The Origins of the term "Palestinian" ("Filasṭīnī") in late Ottoman Palestine, 1898–1914". Academia Letters. doi:10.20935/AL1884. S2CID 237799828.
- Ehrlich, Carl S. (1996). The Philistines in Transition: A History from ca. 1000-730 BC. Leiden, The Netherlands: E. J. Brill. ISBN 90-04-10426-7.
- Feldman, Louis H. (1996). "Some Observations on the Name of Palestine". Studies in Hellenistic Judaism. Arbeiten zur Geschichte des antiken Judentums und des Urchristentums. Vol. 30. Brill Publishers. pp. 553–576. doi:10.1163/9789004332836_024. ISBN 978-90-04-10418-1.
- Feldman, Louis H. (1990). "Some Observations on the Name of Palestine". Hebrew Union College Annual. 61. Hebrew Union College – Jewish Institute of Religion: 1–23. JSTOR 23508170.
- Khalidi, Rashid (1997), Palestinian Identity: The Construction of Modern National Consciousness, Columbia University Press, ISBN 978-0-231-52174-1
- Drews, Robert (1998). "Canaanites and Philistines". Journal for the Study of the Old Testament. 23 (81): 39–61. doi:10.1177/030908929802308104. S2CID 144074940.
- Grief, Howard (2008), "The Name Palestine and the Meaning of Palestinian Nationality during the Mandate Period", The Legal Foundation and Borders of Israel Under International Law: A Treatise on Jewish Sovereignty Over the Land of Israel, Mazo Publishers, pp. 470–482, ISBN 9789657344521
- Gerber, Haim (2008). "The term "Palestine"". Remembering and Imagining Palestine: Identity and Nationalism from the Crusades to the Present. Palgrave Macmillan. pp. 48–53. ISBN 978-0-230-53701-9.
- Gerber, Haim (1998). "'Palestine' and Other Territorial Concepts in the 17th Century". International Journal of Middle East Studies. 30 (4): 563–572. doi:10.1017/s0020743800052569. JSTOR 164341. S2CID 162982234.
- Hallo, William; Younger, Lawson (1997), The Context of Scripture, Brill
- Jacobson, David (1999). "Palestine and Israel". Bulletin of the American Schools of Oriental Research. 313 (313): 65–74. doi:10.2307/1357617. JSTOR 1357617. S2CID 163303829.
- Jacobson, David (2001). "When Palestine Meant Israel". Biblical Archaeology Review. 27 (3). Archived from the original on 2011-07-25.
- Kaegi, Walter Emil (1995) [1992], Byzantium and the early Islamic conquests, Cambridge University Press, ISBN 978-0-521-48455-8
- Killebrew, Ann (2005), Biblical Peoples and Ethnicity: An Archaeological Study of Egyptians, Canaanites, Philistines, and Early Israel, 1300–1100 B.C.E., Society of Biblical Lit, ISBN 978-1-58983-097-4
- Lewis, Bernard (1980). "Palestine: On the History and Geography of a Name". International History Review. 2 (1): 1–12. doi:10.1080/07075332.1980.9640202. ISBN 978-0-8126-9757-5. JSTOR 40105058.
- Le Strange, Guy (1890). Palestine Under the Moslems from AD 650 to 1500, Translated from the Works of the Medieval Arab Geographers. Palestine Exploration Fund.
- Masalha, Nur (2018). Palestine: A Four Thousand Year History. Zed Books, Limited. ISBN 978-1-78699-273-4.
- Matar, Nabil. I. (2011). "Protestant restorationism and the Ortelian mapping of Palestine (with an afterword on Islam)". In Mark Vessey (ed.). The Calling of the Nations: Exegesis, Ethnography, and Empire in a Biblical-historic Present. University of Toronto Press. pp. 59–82. ISBN 978-0-8020-9241-0.
- Noth, Martin (1939). "Zur Geschichte des Namens Palästina". Zeitschrift des Deutschen Palästina-Vereins. 62 (1/2). Deutscher Verein zur Erforschung Palästinas: 125–144. JSTOR 27930226.
- Pritchard, James (1969), Ancient Near Eastern Texts Relating to the Old Testament (ANET), Princeton Univ. Press
- Rainey, Anson F. (2001). "Herodotus' Description of the East Mediterranean Coast". Bulletin of the American Schools of Oriental Research. 321 (321): 57–63. doi:10.2307/1357657. ISSN 0003-097X. JSTOR 1357657. S2CID 163534665. Archived from the original on 2021-07-29.
- Reland, Adrien (1714). "Caput VII: De Nomine Palaestinae, and Caput VIII: De Nomine Syriae Palaestinae, Syriae et Coelesyriae". Hadriani Relandi Palaestina ex monumentis veteribus illustrata (in Latin). Vol. 1. ex libraria Guilielmi Broedelet. pp. 37–48.
- Röhricht, Reinhold (1890). Bibliotheca Geographica Palaestinae: Chronologisches Verzeichniss der auf die Geographie des Heiligen Landes bezüglichen Literatur von 333 bis 1878 und Versuch einer Cartographie [Chronological directory of the literature relating to the geography of the Holy Land from 333 to 1878: and Attempt at a Cartography]. H. Reuther. ISBN 9780790528007. Reprint ISBN 9780790528007.
- Schmidt, Francis (2001). "Palestine, Judaea or Israel". How the Temple Thinks: identity and social cohesion in ancient Judaism. A&C Black. pp. 28–31. ISBN 978-1-84127-208-5.
- Tamari, Salim (2011a). "Shifting Ottoman Conceptions of Palestine: Part 1: Filistin Risalesi and the two Jamals". Jerusalem Quarterly (47): 28–38. doi:10.70190/jq.I47.p28.
- Tamari, Salim (2011w). "Shifting Ottoman Conceptions of Palestine: Part 2: Ethnography and Cartography" (PDF). Jerusalem Quarterly (48): 6–16. doi:10.70190/jq.I48.p6.
- Tuell, Steven S. (1991). "The Southern and Eastern Borders of Abar-Nahara". Bulletin of the American Schools of Oriental Research. 284 (284): 51–57. doi:10.2307/1357193. ISSN 0003-097X. JSTOR 1357193. S2CID 155475074.
