= Cartography of Palestine =

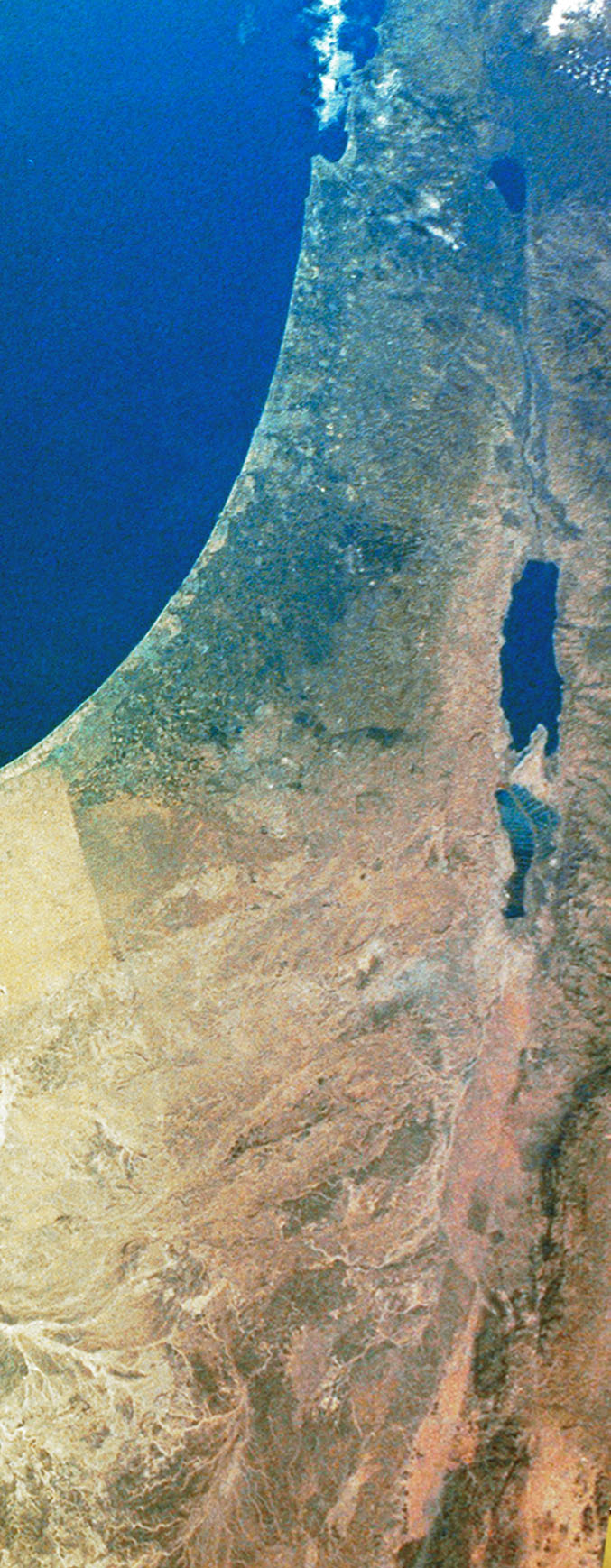
The cartography of the region of Palestine focuses on the geographic region in Western Asia spanning from the Jordan River and the Dead Sea and surroundings to the Eastern Mediterranean. The territory includes what is now Israel (often excluding the southern Negev), the West Bank, the Gaza Strip, and parts of northwestern Jordan.

The cartography of the region of Palestine, also known as cartography of the Holy Land and cartography of the Land of Israel, is the creation, editing, processing and printing of maps of the region of Palestine from ancient times until the rise of modern surveying techniques. For several centuries during the Middle Ages it was the most prominent subject in all of cartography, and it has been described as an "obsessive subject of map art".

The history of the mapping of Palestine is dominated by two cartographic traditions: the biblical school and the classical school. The earliest surviving maps of the biblical tradition derive from the attempts of the early Church Fathers to identify and illustrate the primary locations mentioned in the Bible, and to provide maps for Christian pilgrimage. The earliest surviving maps of the classical tradition derive from the scientific and historical works of the Greco-Roman world; the European rediscovery of Ptolemy's works in the 1400s ended the domination of the biblical tradition. Many Graeco-Roman geographers described the Palestine region in their writings; however, there are no surviving pre-modern originals or copies of these maps – illustrations today of maps according to geographers such as Hecataeus, Herodotus or Eratosthenes are modern reconstructions. The earliest surviving classical maps of the region are Byzantine versions of Ptolemy's 4th Asia map. Cartographic history of Palestine thus begins with Ptolemy, whose work was based on that of the local geographer Marinus of Tyre.

The first lists of maps of the region were made in the late 19th century, by Titus Tobler in his 1867 Geographical Bibliography of Palestine and subsequently by Reinhold Röhricht in his 1890 Geographical Library of Palestine. In a series of articles in the Journal of the German Association for the Study of Palestine between 1891 and 1895, Röhricht presented the first detailed analysis of maps of the region in the middle- and the late Middle Ages. They were followed in 1939-40 by Hans Fischer's History of the Cartography of Palestine. This article lists maps that progressed the cartography of region before the rise of modern surveying techniques, showing how mapmaking and surveying improved and helped outsiders to better understand the geography of the area. Imaginary maps and copies of existing maps are excluded.

== Notable maps of Palestine ==
=== Early maps (2nd–10th centuries) ===
Date	Title	Cartographer	Comments	Region name given	Image
150	Ptolemy's 4th Asia map	Ptolemy and Marinus of Tyre	Considered the "prototype delineation" of the region, Ptolemy's map was based on a lost work by Marinus, born in neighboring Tyre. The earliest known copy, pictured here, is the Codex Vaticanus Urbinas Graecus 82, thought to be from a manuscript of Ptolemy's Geography assembled by Maximus Planudes in Constantinople c. 1300.	The large red letters in the center say in Greek: Παλαιστινης or Palaistinis.	A detailed map of Palestine
410	Notitia Dignitatum	unknown	Notitia Dignitatum of c. 410 AD showing Dux Palestinae, a military region of the Byzantine Empire. This 1436 manuscript by Peronet Lamy is the earliest known copy to survive complete; it was modelled after the lost "Codex Spirensis".	Dux Palastinae	A detailed map of Palestine from the century
450	Tabula Peutingeriana	unknown	Thought to be the only surviving map of the Roman cursus publicus, the state-run road network; the surviving map was created by a monk in Colmar in eastern France in 1265, is named after German antiquarian Konrad Peutinger, and is conserved at the Austrian National Library in Vienna.	Palestina	A detailed map of Palestine from the 5th century
c.560–565	Madaba Map	unknown	The earliest map of Palestine surviving in its original form, and the oldest known geographic floor mosaic in art history. The mosaic was discovered in 1884, but no research was carried out until 1896. It has been heavily used for the localisation and verification of sites in Byzantine Palaestina Prima. It is the earliest surviving map showing the divisions of the Twelve Tribes.	Labels Greek: οροι Αιγυπτου και Παλαιστινης, oroi Aigyptou kai Palaistinis, the "border of Egypt and Palestine".	The 6th century mosaic of Jerusalem
776	Beatus map	Beatus of Liébana	The first medieval Christian world map of relevance to the cartography of Palestine. This copy from 1060 is thought to be the closest to the original out the 14 surviving manuscripts.	no regional name shown	A detailed map of Palestine from the 8th century
952	Istakhri map	Istakhri	Drawn in 952 AD, copy from 1298.	no regional name shown	A detailed map of Palestine from the 10th century
995	Cotton map	unknown	Known as the "Anglo-Saxon" world map. The earliest known map of the world (rather than just the region) showing the divisions of the Twelve Tribes. Thought to be based on the map of Orosius, which is no longer extant.	no regional name shown	A detailed map of Palestine from the 10th century

=== Crusader maps (12th–14th centuries) ===
Date	Title	Cartographer	Comments	Region name given	Image
1154	Tabula Rogeriana	Muhammad al-Idrisi	The Tabula Rogeriana was created in 1154AD; copy from 1533.	The middle of the right hand page label Arabic: فلسطين, romanized: Filasṭīn, lit. 'Palestine'	A detailed map of Palestine from the 12th century
1100s	Ashburnham Libri map	unknown	Europe’s oldest surviving sheet map after the ninth-century Plan of Saint Gall.	no regional name shown	A detailed map of Palestine from the 12th century
1100s	Tournai map of Asia	anonymous monk of Saint Martin's, Tournai	copy of a map of Asia which accompanied De situ et nominibus locorum Hebraeorum, a 4th-5th century work of Jerome.	no regional name shown	A detailed map of Asia including Palestine from the 12th century
1100s	Tournai map of Palestine	anonymous monk of Saint Martin's, Tournai	The earliest known copy is from c. 1150. The map comes from a manuscript of Jerome's De situ et nominibus locorum Hebraeorum, which Jerome states is a translation of Eusebius's Onomasticon. Jerome also explains that Eusebius composed a map which showed the divisions of the Twelve Tribes; no copy of this division has survived.	no regional name shown	A detailed map of Palestine from the century
1250	Oxford Outremer map	Matthew Paris	Created in c.1250, thought to be by Matthew Paris	The Kishon River has the following text along it: Latin: Iste torrens q[ui] parvus est, dividit Siriam a palestinam, i[d est] terram sactam q[ue] est versus austrum et palestinam que est versus aquilonem, lit. 'This river, which is small, divides Syria from Palestine, that is, the Holy Land, which is to the south, and Palestine, which is to the North.'	A detailed map of Palestine from the 13th century
1300	Earliest Burchard map	Burchard of Mount Sion	Considered to be the oldest known Burchard map.	no regional name shown	A detailed map of Palestine from the 14th century
1300s	Later Burchard map	Burchard of Mount Sion	A later map attributed to Burchard.	no regional name shown	A detailed map of Palestine from the 14th century
1321	Sanudo-Vesconte map	Pietro Vesconte	Described by Adolf Erik Nordenskiöld as "the first non-Ptolemaic map of a definite country". Published in Liber Secretorum Fidelium Crucis, a work intended to rekindle the spirit of the crusades. Considered the "first 'modern map' of Palestine" and "served as the basis for most maps of 'Modern Palestine'" throughout the following centuries.	Terra Sancta	A detailed map of Palestine from the 14th century

=== Notable 15th–18th century maps ===
Date	Title	Cartographer	Comments	Region name given	Image
1459	Fra Mauro map	Fra Mauro	1459 world map, considered the most accurate of its age. Fra Mauro had become familiar with the Near East in his travels as s soldier.	Shows the region of "Palestina"	A detailed map of Palestine from the century
1475	Berlinghieri map	Francesco Berlinghieri	Published in the Rudimentum Novitorium it was a version of Ptolemy's map, brought up to date. Together with three updated maps of European countries, Adolf Erik Nordenskiöld described it as the "first germ of modern cartography"	Named "Palestina Moderna et Terra Sancta" (Modern Palestine and the Holy Land)	A detailed map of Palestine from the 15th century
1532	Ziegler map	Jacob Ziegler	1532 map by Jacob Ziegler The map is important to the development of the cartography of Palestine as it represents an early synthesis of multiple sources, including Burchard of Mount Sion, Sanuto, Ptolemy, Strabo, Pliny the Elder, the Antonine Itinerary, Jerome and Eusebius.	"Universalis Palaestinae, continens superiores partuculares tabulas"	A detailed map of Palestine from the century
1537	Mercator map	Gerardus Mercator	1537 map by Gerardus Mercator, three decades before he published his famous Mercator projection. This map was Mercator's first published map, and was based on the map of Jacob Ziegler.	The caption "Candido lectori s[alus]. Palestinam hanc..." translates as: "Fair reader, greeting! We have drawn this map of Palestine, and the Hebrews' route into it from Egypt through the stony regions of Arabia"	A detailed map of Palestine from the century
1570	Ortelius map	Abraham Ortelius	1570 map in Theatrum Orbis Terrarum. Ortelius's depiction of a biblical Palestine in his otherwise contemporary atlas has been criticized; Matari described it as an act "loaded with theological, eschatological, and, ultimately, para-colonial Restorationism".	Captioned "Palaestinae Sive Totius Terrae Promissionis Nova Descriptio" ("Palestine, the whole of the Promised Land, a new description")	A detailed map of Palestine from the century
1590	van Adrichem map	Christian van Adrichem	van Adrichem was a Dutch priest; his maps were published in his Theatrum Terrae Sanctae et Biblicarum Historiarum.	Terra Promissionis	A detailed map of Palestine from the century
1620	Zaddik map	Jacob ben Abraham Zaddiq	A translation into Hebrew of van Adrichem's 1590 map, it is the oldest known printed map in Hebrew.	The first line of the framed colophon includes the description: Hebrew: ציור מצב ארצות כנען, lit. 'A Drawing of the Situation of the Lands of Canaan'	A detailed map of Palestine from the century
1648–1657	Celebi map	Kâtip Çelebi	This 1732 copy of the map by Ottoman geographer Kâtip Çelebi (1609–57) is from the first printed atlas in the Ottoman Empire, and represented the first detailed mapping of the Asian provinces of the empire.	Shows the term ارض فلسطين ("Land of Palestine") extending vertically down the length of the Jordan River.	A detailed map of Palestine from the 17th century
1651	De la Rue map	Philippe de La Rue	From the 1651 six-map atlas La Terre sainte en six cartes géographiques. It was the first published historical atlas in world cartography, in systematically chronological order. The other five maps covered land of Canaan and the Exodus, the Promised Land, Solomon's kingdom, the land of the Jews at the time of Christ, and the Christian Patriarchate of Jerusalem.	Sourie and Terre Saincte.	A detailed map of Palestine from the 17th century
1655	Heidmann map	Christoph Heidmann	Published almost three decades after his death, this map accompanied his Palestina siue Terra Sancta	Palestina and Terre Sanctae	A detailed map of Palestine from the 17th century
1714	Reland map	Adriaan Reland	1714 map	Palaestinae	A detailed map of Palestine from the 18th century
1745	Pococke map	Richard Pococke	1745 map	Holy Land and Syria	A detailed map of Palestine from the 18th century
1769	Bachiene and Maas map	Bachiene and Maas	1769 map	Palaestina	A detailed map of Palestine from the 18th century
1794	d'Anville map	Jean Baptiste Bourguignon d'Anville	Published 1794, almost thirty years after his 1767 map of Biblical Palestine.	Palestina	A detailed map of Palestine from the century

=== Notable 19th century maps ===
Date	Title	Cartographer	Comments	Region name given	Image
1799	Carte de l'Égypte (Description de l'Égypte)	Pierre Jacotin	Originally prepared during the French campaign in Egypt and Syria; 47 sheets were prepared, with the Palestine area being covered by sheets 43-47. The first triangulation-based map of Palestine, it was used as the basis for many most maps of the region until the PEF Survey in the 1870s. It is considered flawed, primarily since it included a significant number of incorrect or imagined details, which had been “added to the map ad libitum where the French had not been able to survey.”	Palestine	A detailed map of Palestine from the century
1803	Cedid Atlas	Müderris Abdurrahman Efendii	The first modern printed atlas in the Ottoman Empire, part of the Nizam-I Cedid reforms of Sultan Selim III, showing Ottoman Syria in the 1803. Considered to be based on the d'Anville 1794 map (published in William Faden's General Atlas), it contained important adaptations to represent Ottoman geographic representations of the provinces.	Shows the term "ارض فلاستان" ("Land of Palestine") in large script on the bottom left.	A detailed map of Palestine from the century
1815	Arrowsmith map	Aaron Arrowsmith	The title "A Sketch of the Countries between Jerusalem and Aleppo" is likely a reference to Henry Maundrell's Journey from Aleppo to Jerusalem published in 1703; the map's description of Jacob's Well is a direct quote from Maundrell. The map also quotes Ulrich Jasper Seetzen, whose Brief Account of the Countries Adjoining the Lake of Tiberias, the Jordan and the Dead Sea was published in 1809. The map is a combination of a modern map and a biblical map (showing the Twelve Tribes)	Pashalic of Acre	A detailed map of Palestine from the 19th century
1822	Burckhardt map	Johann Ludwig Burckhardt	Map accompanying Burckhardt's Travels in Syria and the Holy Land, published in 1822, five years after his travels in the region.	Syria and the Holy Land	A detailed map of Palestine from the 19th century
1830	Hall map	Sidney Hall	1830 map shows the Ottoman divisions	Palestine	A detailed map of Palestine from the 19th century
1840	Royal Engineers map	Charles Rochfort Scott	The first British army survey, carried out during the Oriental Crisis of 1840. It represented the second modern, triangulation-based, attempt at surveying Palestine. It was not published at the time; although a private printing for the British Foreign Office was produced in 1846, and it was used in the creation of Van de Velde's map.	none	A detailed map of Palestine from the 19th century
1841	Kiepert map	Heinrich Kiepert	Published in 1841 to accompany the first edition of Biblical Researches in Palestine by Edward Robinson, known as the "Father of Biblical Geography", and again in 1856 to accompany the second edition.	Palestine	A detailed map of Palestine from the 19th century
1843	Hughes map	William Hughes	Shows the Ottoman administrative districts in detail, made for the Society for the Diffusion of Useful Knowledge. Hughes had been producing popular maps of Palestine for almost a decade, notably in his 1840 Illuminated Atlas of Scripture geography.	Palestine	A detailed map of Palestine from the 19th century
1849	Lynch map	William F. Lynch	Prepared on behalf of the United States Hydrographic Office. Published in Narrative of the United States' Expedition to the River Jordan and the Dead Sea.	The Dead Sea and River Jordan	A detailed map of Palestine from the 19th century
1850	Zimmermann map	Carl Zimmermann	The Atlas von Palaestina und der Sinai Halbinsel, in 15 sectional sheets. Part of a wider Atlas of Asia, published as a supplement to Carl Ritter's Erdkunde	Palaestina	A detailed map of Palestine from the 19th century
1858	Van de Velde map	Charles William Meredith van de Velde	Published in 1858. One of the most accurate maps published prior to the PEF Survey.	The Holy Land	A detailed map of Palestine from the 19th century
1870	Leves en Galilee	Jean-Joseph Mieulet and Isidore Derrien	A follow-up to a map of Lebanon. It was intended to be the first part of a complete coverage of Palestine, but the expedition was recalled to France at the outbreak of the Franco-Prussian war. It was published in 1873.	Galilee	A detailed map of Galilee from the 19th century
1872-1880	PEF Survey	Charles Wilson and others	Carried out by the Palestine Exploration Fund, with support from the War Office. Represented the peak of the cartographic work in Palestine in the nineteenth century.	26 sheets of "Western Palestine" and 1 sheet of "Eastern Palestine".	A detailed map of Palestine from the 19th century

== Modern cartography ==
- Commons:Maps of Palestine from the German Vermessungsabteilung (1918), and Gottlieb Schumacher
- Survey of Palestine (1920-48)
- Survey of Israel (1948 onwards)

== Biblical / imaginary maps ==
- John Speed map of Canaan
- Nolin map

== See also ==
- Cartography of Jerusalem
- Travelogues of Palestine

== Bibliography ==
- Bartlett, John R. (2009). "Early Printed Maps Of Galilee". In Zuleika Rodgers; Margaret Daly-Denton; Anne Fitzpatrick-McKinley (eds.). A Wandering Galilean: Essays in Honour of Seán Freyne. Brill. pp. 185–204. doi:10.1163/ej.9789004173552.i-622.53. ISBN 978-90-474-2701-8.
- Bartlett, John R. (5 July 2017). Mapping Jordan Through Two Millennia. Taylor & Francis. ISBN 978-1-351-55927-0.
- Fischer, Hans [in German] (1939). "Geschichte Der Kartographie Von Palästina" [History of the Cartography of Palestine (part 1)]. Zeitschrift des Deutschen Palästina-Vereins. 62 (4): 169–189. JSTOR 27930237.
- —— (1940). "Geschichte Der Kartographie Von Palästina (Fortsetzung Und Schluß)" [History of the Cartography of Palestine (continuation and conclusion)]. Zeitschrift des Deutschen Palästina-Vereins. 63 (1): 1–111. JSTOR 27930252.
- Gavish, Dov (2005). "The first maps based on origin surveys". A Survey of Palestine Under the British Mandate, 1920-1948. Psychology Press. ISBN 978-0-7146-5651-9.
- Goren, Haim (2001). "Reviewed Work: Image and Reality: Jerusalem in Maps and Views by Rehav Rubin". Erdkunde. 55 (1): 98–100. JSTOR 25647350.
- Goren, Haim (2002). "Sacred, but Not Surveyed: Nineteenth-Century Surveys of Palestine". Imago Mundi. 54: 87–110. doi:10.1080/03085690208592960. JSTOR 1151507. S2CID 140702955.
- Harvey, P. D. A. (2012). Medieval Maps of the Holy Land. British Library. ISBN 978-0-7123-5824-8.
- Hopkins, I. W. J. “Nineteenth-Century Maps of Palestine: Dual-Purpose Historical Evidence,” Imago Mundi, vol. 22, 1968, pp. 30–36. JSTOR,
- Karmon, Yehuda [in Hebrew] (1960). "An Analysis of Jacotin's Map of Palestine". Israel Exploration Journal. 10 (3): 155–173. JSTOR 27924824.
- Kalner, David [in Hebrew] (1941). "The Development of the Topographical Maping of Palestine / התפתחות המפות הטופוגראפיות של ארץ ישראל". Bulletin of the Jewish Palestine Exploration Society / ידיעות החברה העברית לחקירת ארץ-ישראל ועתיקותיה. ט' (א'): 33–38. JSTOR 23724373.
- Laor, Eran (1986). Maps of the Holy Land: cartobibliography of printed maps, 1475-1900. A.R. Liss. ISBN 978-0-8451-1705-7.
- Levy-Rubin, Milka; Rubin, Rehav (1996). "The Image of the Holy City: Maps and Mapping of Jerusalem". In Nitza Rosovsky (ed.). City of the Great King: Jerusalem from David to the Present. Harvard University Press. ISBN 978-0-674-36708-1.
- Masalha, Nur (2019). Palestine: A Four Thousand Year History. Zed Books, Limited. ISBN 978-1-78699-273-4.
- Matar, Nabil I. (2011). "Protestant restorationism and the Ortelian mapping of Palestine". In Mark Vessey; Sharon Betcher; Robert Daum; Harry O. Maier (eds.). The Calling of the Nations: Exegesis, Ethnography, and Empire in a Biblical-Historic Present. University of Toronto Press, Scholarly Publishing Division. pp. 59–82. ISBN 978-1-4426-5949-0.
- Moscrop, John James (1 January 2000). Measuring Jerusalem: The Palestine Exploration Fund and British Interests in the Holy Land. A&C Black. pp. 22–. ISBN 978-0-7185-0220-1.
- Nebenzahl, Kenneth (1986). Maps of the Holy Land: Images of Terra Sancta Through Two Millennia. Abbeville Press. ISBN 978-0-89659-658-0.
- Nissen, Kristian (1956). "Jacob Ziegler's Palestine Schondia Manuscript University Library, Oslo, MS. 917-4". Imago Mundi. 13: 45–52. doi:10.1080/03085695608592125. JSTOR 1150240.
- Nordenskiöld, Adolf Erik (1889). Facsimile-atlas to the Early History of Cartography: With Reproductions of the Most Important Maps Printed in the XV and XVI Centuries (Swedish original title: Facsimile atlas till kartografiens äldsta historia). Kraus. pp. 51, 64.
- North, Robert Grady (1979). A history of biblical map making. Reichert. ISBN 978-3-88226-042-7.
- Preciado, Kathleen (1989). Retaining the original: multiple originals, copies, and reproductions. National Gallery of Art, Center for Advanced Study in the Visual Arts (U.S.), Johns Hopkins University. ISBN 978-0-89468-113-4.
- Röhricht, Reinhold (1890). Bibliotheca Geographica Palaestinae: Chronologisches Verzeichniss der auf die Geographie des Heiligen Landes bezüglichen Literatur ("Geographical Library of Palestine: Chronological Index of Literature relating to the Geography of the Holy Land"). Reuther und Reichard. ISBN 9780790528007.
- —— (1891). "Karten und Pläne zur Palästinakunde aus dem 7. bis 16. Jahrhundert". Zeitschrift des Deutschen Palästina-Vereins. 14: 8–11, 87–92, 137–141.
- —— (1892). "Karten und Pläne zur Palästinakunde aus dem 7. bis 16. Jahrhundert". Zeitschrift des Deutschen Palästina-Vereins. 15: 34–39 and 185–188. JSTOR 27928617.
- —— (1895). "Karten und Pläne zur Palästinakunde aus dem 7. bis 16. Jahrhundert". Zeitschrift des Deutschen Palästina-Vereins. 18: 173–182.
- —— (1898). "Marino Sanudo sen. als Kartograph Palästinas". Zeitschrift des Deutschen Palästina-Vereins. 21: 84–126.
- —— (1901). "Die Palästinakarte Bernhard von Breitenbach's". Zeitschrift des Deutschen Palästina-Vereins. 24: 129–135.
- —— (1904). "Die Palästinakarte des William Wey". Zeitschrift des Deutschen Palästina-Vereins. 27: 188–193.
- Rubin, Rehav (22 May 2018). Portraying the Land: Hebrew Maps of the Land of Israel from Rashi to the Early 20th Century. Walter de Gruyter GmbH & Co KG. ISBN 978-3-11-057065-6.
- Schelhaas, Bruno; Faehndrich, Jutta; Goren, Haim (28 February 2017). Mapping the Holy Land: The Foundation of a Scientific Cartography of Palestine. Bloomsbury Publishing. ISBN 978-0-85772-785-5.
- Tamari, Salim (22 August 2017). The Great War and the Remaking of Palestine. Univ of California Press. ISBN 978-0-520-29125-6.
- Tishby, Ariel (2001). Holy Land in Maps. Israel Museum. ISBN 978-0-8478-2412-0.
- Tobler, Titus (1867). Bibliographia Geographica Palaestinae. Zunächst Kristiche Übersicht Gedruckter und Ungedruckter Beschreibungen der Reisen ins Heilige Land ("Geographical Bibliography of Palestine. The First Critical Overview of Printed and Unprinted Descriptions of Travels to the Holy Land").
- Wajntraub, Eva; Wajntraub, Gimpel (1992). Hebrew Maps of the Holy Land. Brüder Hollinek. ISBN 978-3-85119-248-3.
- Wood, Denis (16 April 2010). "Mapmaking, Counter-Mapping, and Map Art in the Mapping of Palestine". Rethinking the Power of Maps. Guilford Press. ISBN 978-1-60623-708-3.
