= Paul Gottlieb Werlhof =

German physician and poet (1699–1767)

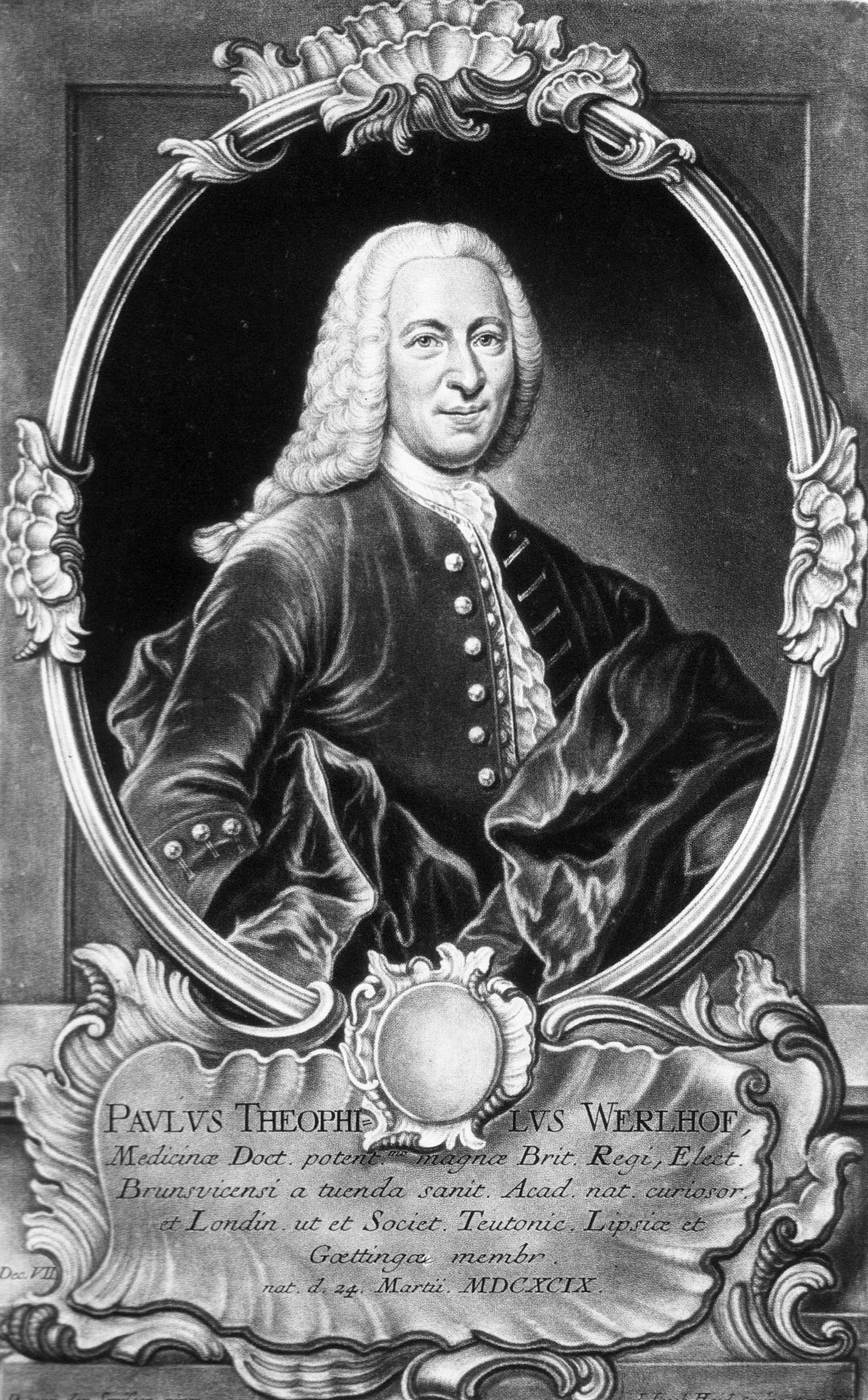
Paul Gottlieb Werlhof.

Paul Gottlieb Werlhof (24 March 1699 – 26 July 1767) was a German physician and poet who was a native of Helmstedt.

He studied medicine at the University of Helmstedt under Lorenz Heister (1683–1758) and Brandanus Meibom (1678–1740), who was the son of Heinrich Meibom (1638–1700). After completing his studies, he practiced medicine in Peine for four years, and in 1725 moved to Hannover, where he became one of the more influential physicians in Europe. In 1740 was appointed Königlicher Leibarzt, physician to Hannover royalty. Werlhof would remain in Hannover until his death in 1767.

In 1735, Werlhof coined the name "morbus haemorrhagicus maculosus" which was later referred to as idiopathic thrombocytopenic purpura (ITP), a bleeding disorder. However, his description of the condition is not in keeping with ITP: He wrote: "Vidi, verbi causa, ante quinquennium, ubi solitarius hic affectus, in puella decenni, haemorrhagiam largam sanguinis foetidi, sinceri partim, partim nigri, partim serosi, per nares, gingivas, arteriam asperam, vomitum, fecessium, urinam, a primo inde initio ad finem usque, alternis ανωμαλως vicibus, produxit, cum animi deliquiis et extremorum perfrigeratione, et maculis totum sensim corpore erumpentibus, copiosis, nigerimis." which in English means: I saw, for example, five years ago, as an isolated symptom, in a ten year old girl, a large hemorrhage of fetid blood, partially pure, partially black, partially serous, from the nose, the gums, the windpipe, from vomiting, feces, urine, from the beginning until the end going along with other anomalies like confusion and extreme shivering, and a lot of black spots erupting on her entire skin. This description is more compatible with a generalized coagulation disorder (DISQUISITIO MEDICA ET PHILOLOGICA DE VARIOLIS ET ANTHRACIBUS - PAUL GOTTLIEB WERLHOF, 1735, page 79). In addition to his reputation as a physician, Werlhof was highly regarded as a poet, and was a good friend of anatomist Albrecht von Haller (1708–1777), who was also an accomplished poet. Werlhof composed his poems and hymns in German, while his medical treatises were written in Latin. Among his written works were a 1732 treatise on fevers called Observationes de febribus, and a collection of poetry titled Gedichte.
