= Lorenz Heister =

German anatomist, surgeon and botanist

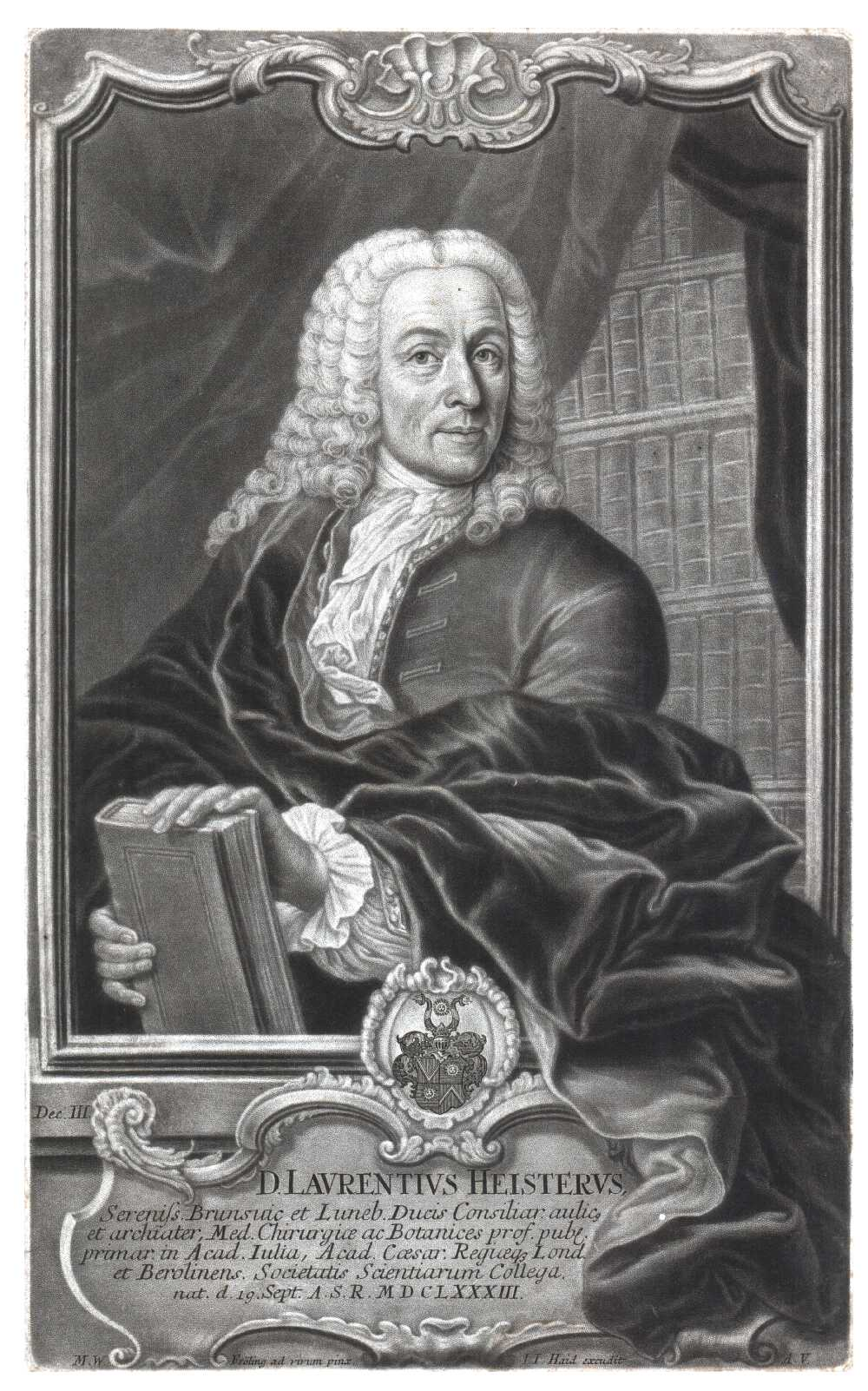
- Born: Lorenz Heister; 19 September 1683
- Died: 18 April 1758 (aged 74)

Lorenz Heister (Latin: Laurentius Heister) (19 September 1683-18 April 1758) was a German anatomist, surgeon and botanist born in Frankfurt am Main.

== Biography ==
From 1702 to 1706, Heister studied at the Universities of Giessen and Wetzlar, afterwards relocating to Amsterdam, where he studied anatomy under Frederik Ruysch (1638–1731). In the summer of 1707, he was an assistant physician in field hospitals at Brussels and Ghent during the War of the Spanish Succession. He then traveled to Leiden, where he studied anatomy under Bernhard Siegfried Albinus (1653–1721) and Govert Bidloo (1649–1713), also attending Hermann Boerhaave’s lectures on chemistry and ocular diseases.

In 1708, he earned his doctorate from the University of Harderwijk, and in the summer of 1709, rejoined the Dutch military as a field surgeon during the Siege of Tournai. Shortly afterwards, he distinguished himself in treatment of the wounded from the Battle of Malplaquet.

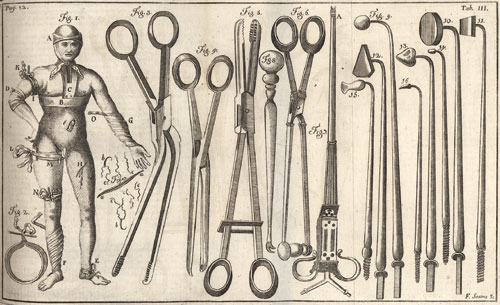
Surgical devices from Heister's "Institutiones chirurgicae".

In 1711, he was appointed professor of anatomy and surgery at the University of Altdorf, and from 1720, was a professor of anatomy and surgery at Helmstedt, where he remained for the rest of his life. During his tenure at Helmstedt, he also taught classes in botany and practical medicine. In 1730 he was elected a Fellow of the Royal Society.

Among his numerous writings, his best-known work is Chirurgie, a book on surgery that was translated into several languages. It was used extensively in Japan, and was still employed as a standard text at Vienna as late as 1838. Heister's botanical garden in Helmstedt was considered one of the most beautiful in Germany.

In 1718, he coined the word "tracheotomy". Also, he is credited for being the first physician to perform a post-mortem section of appendicitis. His name is lent to the plant genus Heisteria, as well as to the spiral valves of Heister, defined as anatomical folds of the cystic duct. He died in Bornum am Elm.

His botanical writings were published as Beschreibung eines neuen Geschlechts in 1755, with illustrated descriptions of plants.

== Principal writings ==
- Compendium anatomicum, initially published in 1721, 10 editions overall.
- Chirurgie, initially published in 1731, 15 editions overall.
- Institutiones chirurgicae, 1749.
- Beschreibung eines neuen Geschlechts, Braunschweig 1755 (Beschr. Neu. Geschl.)
