= Spiral valve (disambiguation) =

The term spiral valve may refer to:

- Intestinal spiral valves, the lower portion of the intestine of some sharks, rays, skates and bichirs
- Spiral valves of Heister, valves in the proximal mucosa of the cystic duct
- The spiral valve of the conus arteriosus, as found in some amphibians and lungfish
