= Tournai maps =

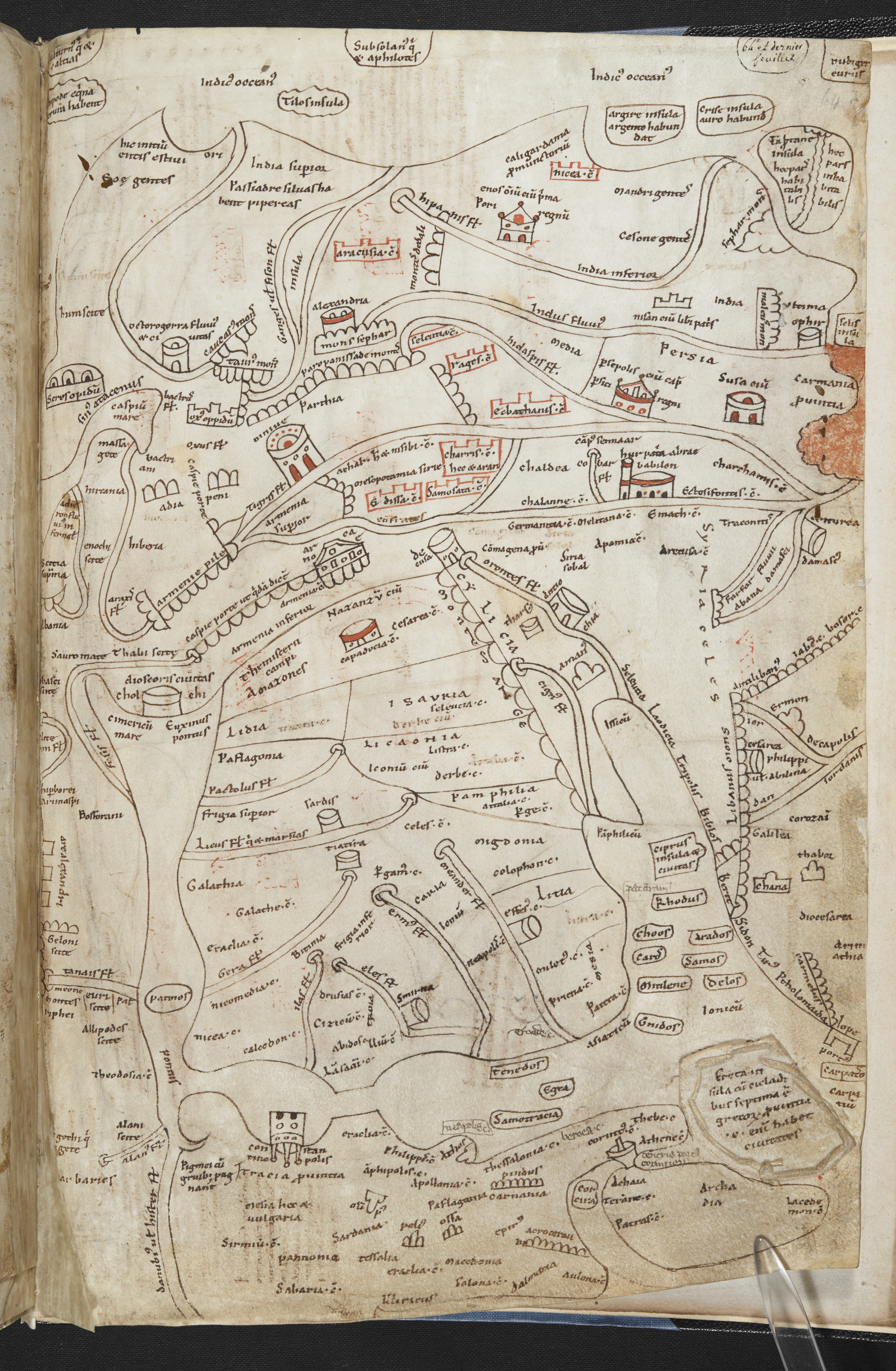
Tournai map of Asia

The Tournai maps, often known as the Jerome maps, are a pair of maps with Latin labels found in a single late 12th-century manuscript copy of Jerome's Latin translation of Eusebius's Onomasticon. One map depicts the Holy Land (Palestine) while the other depicts Asia. Although the preface of the Onomasticon refers to a map of the Holy Land, the 12th-century map cannot be a faithful copy of the original map.

== Description ==
There are 278 labels on the Asian map and 195 on the Palestinian map. The Asian map includes Greece and the eastern Mediterranean. It extends as far east as Sri Lanka (Taprotane). It is in portrait format with east at the top. Asia Minor takes up an inordinate amount of space in the middle. The Palestinian map is also oriented east up, but is in landscape format. It covers an area stretching from the Nile to the Ganges.

There are few pictorial elements. Most cities are shown with generic towers, mountains with humps. The Trees of the Sun and Moon and the Pillars of Hercules are among the few "illustrative flights". The Hyrcanian forest is illustrated by trees. Noah's ark is shown on the map of Asia but only labelled on that of Palestine.

The maps were intended as a supplement to the text. The labelling of the maps mainly reflects late Roman terminology rather than that of the 12th century. There is only one later name: Bulgaria. It is equated with Moesia, where the Bulgars only settled in 678. There are mythological elements, such as an island of Gorgons in the Red Sea. Rivers are always shown rising in mountains or springs in accordance with classical geography and the Garden of Eden is not depicted.

A natural hole in the parchment was patched before the maps were drawn. The mapmaker used the hole to represent the island of Crete on the Asian map and the Caucasus on the Palestinian map.

== History ==
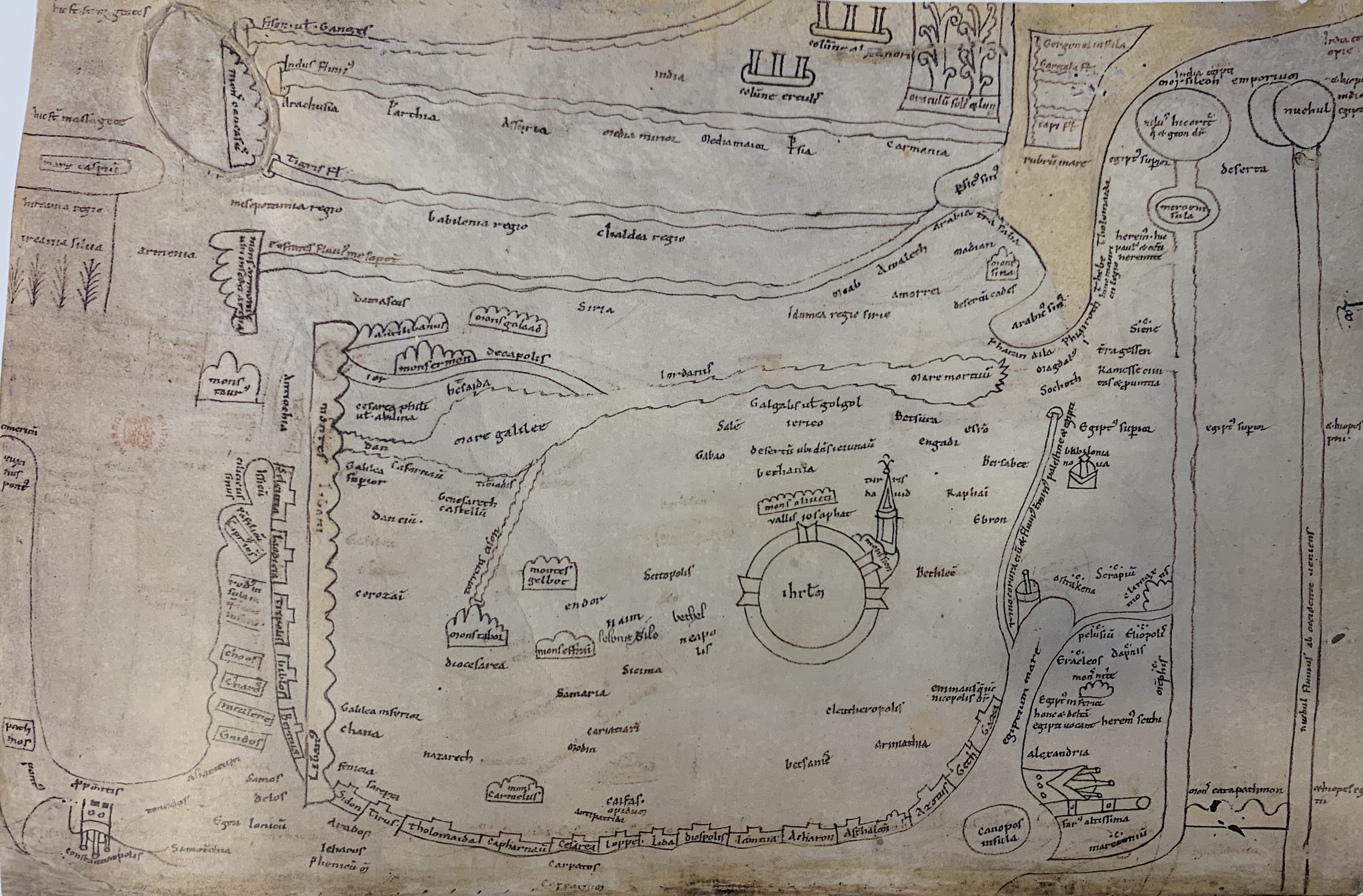
Tournai map of Palestine

The manuscript is now number 10049 of the Additional manuscripts in the British Library in London. The maps are found on the recto and verso (front and back) of the last folio, number 64. It was produced at Saint Martin's Abbey in Tournai for the abbey's own library. The book of "Jerome on the Hebrew names in one volume" that is mentioned in the library catalogue for 1159 may be this work.

The current maps are not the original drawings but are palimpsests. Before the end of the 12th century, an earlier map of Palestine on the recto was erased to make room for the map of Asia. Likewise, a map of Palestine on the verso was partially erased and redrawn to produce the current (third) map of Palestine. It cannot be determined which of the earlier two maps of Palestine was drawn first, but the parchment patch was added after the first map on the recto was drawn. Both erased maps were drawn before the map of Asia. All the maps were the work of a single mapmaker, as the consistent handwriting attests. There are, across both maps, only eight labels that were added over subsequent centuries.

The Tournai maps are extracts from a world map, but the erased maps and the final maps were based on different source maps. The model for the final maps is lost but a description of a related map survives in a 12th-century north Italian manuscript, now Naples, Biblioteca Nazionale, IV.D.21. This description itself was written at the abbey of Bobbio in the 11th century and the map described is listed in a catalogue of the library of Bobbio from 1461. The map was "in the Irish style" and in "Lombard script", indicating that it was of great age. It may be the "book of cosmography" recorded in a 9th-century library catalogue. The lost map of Bobbio and the model for the Tournai maps both go back to a map created at the abbey of Iona between the 6th and 8th centuries, itself based on a continental world map, tentatively linked to Eucherius of Lyon.

The manuscript remained at the abbey until its dissolution in 1796, after which it passed through the hands of Amans-Alexis Monteil before being acquired by the British Library in 1836. The first study of the maps was published by Konrad Miller in 1895, arguing that they were copies of Jerome's original maps, themselves based on Eusebius' maps. There is no evidence, however, that either Jerome or Eusebius produced maps of Palestine or Asia.
