= Gilles Li Muisis =

French chronicler and poet

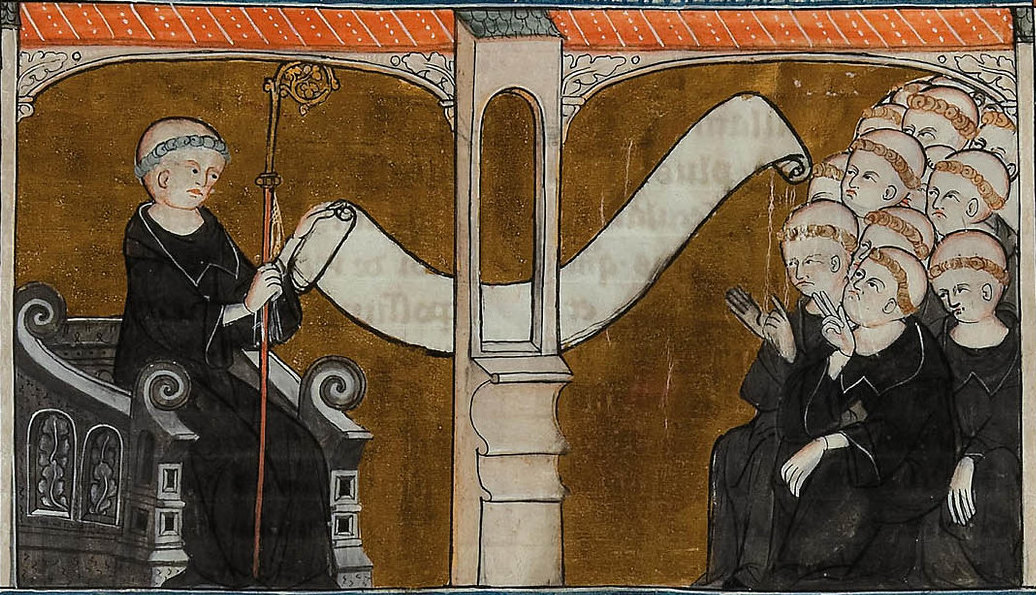
Gilles addressing his monks

Gilles Li Muisis (or Le Muiset) (c. 1272 – 15 October 1352) was a French chronicler and poet.

== Life ==
Li Muisis was probably born at Tournai around 1272. In 1289 he entered the Benedictine abbey of Saint-Martin in his native city, becoming prior of this house in 1327 and abbot four years later. He only secured the latter position after a contest with a competitor, but he appears to have been a wise ruler of the abbey. He died on 15 October 1352.

== Works ==
Gilles wrote two Latin chronicles, Chronicon majus and Chronicon minus, dealing with the history of the world, spanning from its creation up to 1349. This work, which was expanded by another writer to encompass 1352, is valuable for containing the history of northern France and Flanders in the first half of the 14th century. It is published by J. J. de Smet in the Corpus chronicorum Flandriae. Gilles also wrote some French poems, Poesies de Gilles Li Muisis, which have been published by Baron Kervyn de Lettenhove.
