= Franz Heinrich Ludolf Ahrens =

German philologist (1809–1881)

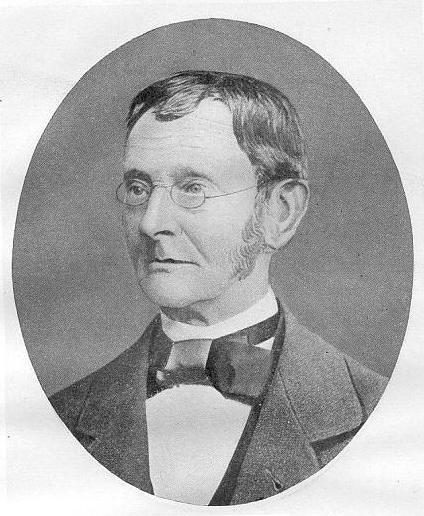
- Franz Heinrich Ludolf Ahrens
- Born: June 6, 1809; Helmstedt, Duchy of Brunswick
- Died: September 25, 1881 (aged 72); Hanover, German Empire
- Occupations: Philologist, educator
- Awards: Corresponding member of the Saint Petersburg Academy of Sciences

Academic background
- Education: University of Göttingen

Academic work
- Discipline: Greek dialectology, Homeric studies
- Notable works: De Graecae Linguae Dialectis, Bucolicorum Graecorum Reliquiae

Franz Heinrich Ludolf Ahrens (6 June 1809, Helmstedt – 25 September 1881, Hanover) was a German philologist.

He was born in Helmstedt. After studying at the University of Göttingen (1826-1829) under Karl Otfried Müller and Georg Ludolf Dissen, he worked as a schoolteacher at the Pädagogium in Ilfeld (from 1831). In 1845, he was appointed director of the gymnasium in Lingen, and in 1849 succeeded GF Grotefend as director of the Lyceum at Hanover, a post which he filled with great success for thirty years.

His most important work was "De Graecae Linguae Dialectis" (1839-1843), a study of Aeolic and Doric dialects that became a standard treatise on the subject. He also published "Bucolicorum Graecorum Reliquiae" (1855-1859); studies on the dialects of Homer and the Greek lyrists; on Aeschylus ("De causis quibusdam Aeschyli Nondum satis emendati"); and some excellent school textbooks. A volume of his minor works (edited by Carl Ernst Christian Häberlin) was published in 1891, which also contains a complete list of his writings.

== Selected works ==
- De Athenarum statu politico et literario inde ab Achaici foederis interitu usque ad Antoninorum tempora, 1829.
- De causis quibusdam Aeschyli nondum satis emendati commentatio, 1832.
- De Graecae Linguae Dialectis. Lib. 1, 2, Gottingae, apud Vandenhoek et Ruprecht, 1839–43.
  - "Lib. I. De dialectis aeolicis et pseudaeolicis", 1839.
  - "Lib. II. De dialecto dorica", 1843.
- Griechisches Elementarbuch aus Homer, 1850 – Greek primer on Homer.
- Griechische Formenlehre des Homerischen und Attischen Dialektes, etc., 1852 – Greek morphology on Homeric and Attican dialects.
- "An Elementary Greek Reader, from Homer" [being the Odyssey, Book IX. 39 to End]; with Grammatical Introduction, Notes, and Glossary. By Dr. H.L. Ahrens. ... First Course. edited by T.K. Arnold; London, 1852 - 101 pages.
- Epitaphius Adonidis, 1854.
- Bucolicorum Græcorum Theocriti, Bionis, Moschi Reliquiæ, 1855.
- Studien zum Agamemnon des Aeschylus, 1860 – Studies of Agamemnon and Aeschylus.
- Beiträge zur griechischen und lateinischen Etymologie, 1879 – On Greek and Latin etymology.
- Kleine Schriften (edited by Carl Haeberlin), 1891 – Smaller works.
