= Heinrich Heshusius =

German Lutheran pastor, superintendent, and polemicist

Heinrich Heshusius (also Hesshus) (July 1556 in Rostock – 15 October 1597 in Hildesheim) was a prominent third-generation German Lutheran pastor, superintendent, and polemicist. He was the second son of Tilemann Heshusius and Hanna von Bert, two well-educated and influential German Lutherans from Wesel on the lower Rhine.

== Early life and education ==
Heinrich was born in 1556, raised in the household of an important Lutheran clergyman, and he was strongly influenced by his father's itinerant movements and polemical struggles with Reformed (Calvinist) churchmen and Roman Catholic opponents. Heinrich eventually followed his father into Lutheran schools and the ministry, and became well-connected in Gnesio-Lutheran clergy networks in North Germany.

In 1594, Heshusius earned a doctoral degree in theology from the University of Rostock, which was paid for by the Hildesheim town council. Heshusius worked for a period of up to ten years with his father as a philosophy (liberal arts) professor at the University of Helmstedt, where he served as an instructor and a private tutor for bachelor of arts students headed into the ministry or government service.

== Ministry ==
In 1591, Heshusius took his first permanent pastoral assignment in Tonna, near Erfurt, and served the community as a pastor and superintendent. In Tonna, Heshusius had a close relationship with the counts of Gleichen and the Ernestine rulers of Electoral Saxony, and he founded a school there at the behest of a local countess. He also began a successful publishing career, printing many sermons and an innovative catechism based on the Psalms that would become influential in Lutheran circles.

In 1593, Heshusius was transferred to Hildesheim by Polycarp Leyser, when Nicholas Selnecker vacated the post, and Heshusius became the lead pastor at St. Andreas Church, as well as superintendent of the city's Lutheran churches. Heshusius became a significant leader in Lutheran circles, corresponding with peers and mentors throughout the region, and working closely with civic leaders in Hildesheim. Along with the town council, Heshusius supported the Formula of Concord. He used his new platform to publish catechetical sermons, devotional books, and a municipal report with conspicuous polemic. Most of these publications sought to protect the Lutheran community from what Heshusius perceived as the inroads of confessional rivals in the region such as Calvinists, Jesuits, Anabaptists, and Jews. His rhetoric has been studied as an aspect of late-Reformation confessionalization in the German lands.

In the mid-1590s, Heshusius attacked the levirate marriage of Jews in his community, and he worked aggressively to expel thirteen Jewish families from Hildesheim. Heshusius also tried to expel Jesuit leaders from the city, who were forming a Latin school and reviving the historic Roman Catholic cathedral, but these efforts were also unsuccessful.

Heshusius's masterwork, a two-volume catechetical sermon collection entitled Psalmocatechesis, was published in 1594. It was based on the content and pedagogy of Luther's Small Catechism and the Psalms, and it became influential in the developing genre of Lutheran catechetical preaching.

== Death ==
In 1597, Heinrich Heshusius died of the plague in Hildesheim with his wife Gesa and the couple's four children.

== Legacy ==
Heinrich Heshusius contributed to the consolidation of German Lutheranism in the age of early Lutheran orthodoxy. His catechetical works and preaching influenced a generation of Lutheran churchmen.

Church historian Joachim Lauenstein wrote that had Heshusius not died prematurely at 41, the brilliant theologian would have been among the greatest Lutheran reformers in the region.

For modern historians, the life and career of Heshusius has been used as a gateway to understanding the influence of relatively "ordinary" parish pastors and administrators during the late Reformation period. His career highlights the importance of academic training and ecclesiastical networks, and the influence of local politics on parish life and culture. "We cannot often reach the craftsmen and peasants of early modern Europe directly, but we can reach them via preachers, printers, travelers, officials."

== Printed works ==
Disputations

- Propositiones de Lege Divina (Henricopoli [Wolfenbuettel], 1578). HAB. Helmstedt disputation concerning the role of the law in Lutheran theology, prepared by Tilemann Heshusius.
- Disputatio de infantum baptismo contra anabaptistarum errores (Helmstedt, 1580). HAB. Helmstedt disputation concerning the competing theology and ritual of Anabaptists, prepared by Johannes Olearius.
- Propositiones de Deo: De quibus, Deo iuvante et Spiritum largiente (Helmstedt, 1580). HAB. Helmstedt disputation concerning the efficacy of the Holy Spirit, prepared by Tilemann Heshusius.

Poetry

- Carmina gratulatoria in honorem... (Helmstedt, 1579). HAB. Latin poems written in honor of the wedding of Johannes Olearius, written by Heinrich and his brother Gottfried.
- Epicedia, in Obitum Infantis Metthae Heshusiae, Qvae Septimanas Octo Et biduum nata, ex hac miseriarum valle in aeternam patriam vocata est, Filiolae Clariß: & Doctiß: viri, Dn: Henrici Heshusij, sacrae Theologiae Doctoris dignißimi, & Superintendentis Hildesiensis vigilantißimi, scripta ab amicus (Henricopoli [Wolfenbüttel]: Horn, 1597). HAB. Commemorative funeral poetry for Gesa and Heinrich Heshusius's daughter Meta, written in Latin by friends of the Heshusius family.

Catechisms

- Psalmocatechesis, Das ist: Concordantia oder Einhelligkeit, desz heiligen Catechismi vnd der Psalmen Davids, in Predigten verfasset, 2 vols. (Leipzig: Lamberg, 1594 [first printing] and 1595 [second printing]). A two-volume collection of 60 catechetical sermons based on Psalms and the five articles of Luther's Small Catechism. 1594 set at HALLE; 1595 set at HAB.
- Einfeltige kurtze Anleitung, wie man die Psalmen Davids nach der Lehre des heiligen Catechismi lesen... (Leipzig, 1593 [first printing] and 1594 [second printing]). HAB and Sta. Hild. Catechism based on the Psalms and Luther's Small Catechism, arranged in facing columns.

Sermons

- Hochzeit Predigt Vber den Spruch Esaie am LXI Capitel, Jch frewe mich in dem Herren … (Erffordt, Johann Beck, 1590). HAB, HALLE. Wedding sermon based on Isaiah 61:10.
- HochzeitPredigt Auß dem 62. Capitel Esaie / vo den worten: Zu Zion spricht der Herr: Man soll dich nicht mehr die verlassene / noch dein Land eine Wüstung heissen... (Erfurt, 1591). HAB, Sta. Hild. Wedding sermon for Erasmus Eccelio in Weringshausen.
- Leichpredigt Aus dem 35. Capittel des Ersten Buchs Mosis ... (Heinrichstadt, 1595). HAB. Funeral sermon for Anna Sonnenberg, the wife of the Hildesheim city physician.
- Drei Leichenpredigten: Die erste. Bey der Begrebnis der Edlen / vnd Tugentsamen Frawen Adelheit / gebornen von Reden / des Edlen / Gestrengen / vnd Ernvesten Ludolff Rauschblaten / weiland Drosten auff der Bischöfflichen Hildesheimischen Residentz Steurwalt / etc. sehligen / Wittben auch sehligen / den 26. Maij. Anno M.D.XCVI.; Die andern beide. Bey den Begrebnissen der Edlen / vnnd Ernvesten Seband vnnd Ludolff von Stockheim / gebrüdern / seligen. Anno 93. 7. Decemb. Vnd Anno 96. den 1. Septemb. / Gethan zu Hildesheim Durch Henricum Heshusium D. Superinten. (Leipzig: Abraham Lampberg, 1596). HAN. Sermons preached for the funerals of Adelheit Rauschblat and her two sons Seband von Stockheim and Ludolf von Stockheim.
- Leichpredigt aus dem 90. Psalm / Weiland des Edlen / Gestrengen / Ehrnvesten und Manhafften Herrn Asca von Holle… (Heinrichstadt, 1596). HAB. Funeral sermon for Asca von Holle (1529–1594) based on Psalm 90.
- Zwo Christliche Leichpredigten. Die eine / Vber der Leich der ... Frawen Dorotheen / Herrn Rudolphen von Harlesem seligen Tochter / vnd des ... Herrn Christophori Vvildfevrs, Bürgers vnd Vier vnd zwantzigers der alten Stad Hildesheim ... ([Jena], 1597?). JENA. Two funeral sermons; the first preached by Heshusius for Dorothea, the wife of Hildesheim burger Christoph Wildfewr, and the second preached by Samuel Fischer for Dorothea's husband.

Municipal reports/polemic

- Bericht von einem Juden / so die Tauffe zu erst betrieglich gesuchet / und doch durch Gottes Bericht wunderbarlich zu erkentnis seiner Sünden kommen / Die Tauffe erlanget / und in warem Glauben und bekentnis des Herrn Christi bestendig verharret ist / bis an sein Ende (Hildesheim, 1596). HAB, HALLE, and Sta. Hild. Heshusius's printed report of the catechesis, baptism, and execution of Michael Duelke in Hildesheim.

Abbreviations: HAB (Herzog August Bibliothek), HALLE (Universitäts– und Landesbibliothek Halle), HAN (Hannover Niedersächsische Landesbibliothek—Gottfried Wilhelm Leibniz Bibliothek), JENA (Thüringer Universitäts– und Landesbibliothek Jena), and Sta Hild. (Stadtarchiv Hildesheim).

== Bibliography ==
- Ahrens, Sabine. (2004). Die Lehrkrafte der Universitat Helmstedt (1576-1810). Helmstedt.
- Burke, Peter. (1978). Popular Culture in Early Modern Europe. New York: Harper & Row.
- Halvorson, Michael J. (2010). Heinrich Heshusius and Confessional Polemic in Early Lutheran Orthodoxy. Farnham, England: Ashgate. Reissued by Routledge in paperback (2024).
- Halvorson, Michael J. (2008). "Jews and Jesuits in a Confessional Age: Heinrich Heshusius and the Boundaries of Community in Hildesheim." Sixteenth Century Journal 39/3: 639-655.
- Heshusius, Heinrich. (1593, 1594). Einfeltige kurtze Anleitung, wie man die Psalmen Davids nach der Lehre des heiligen Catechismi lesen... Leipzig.
- Heshusius, Heinrich. (1594). Psalmocatechesis, Das ist: Concordantia oder Einhelligkeit, desz heiligen Catechismi vnd der Psalmen Davids, in Predigten verfasset, 2 vols. Leipzig.
- Kolb, Robert, ed. (2008). Lutheran Ecclesiastical Culture, 1550-1675. Leiden: Brill.
- Kruger, Thilo. (2004). Die Christologie Tilemann Heshusens, 1527-1588. Göttingen.
- Lauenstein, Joachim Barward (1735). Hildesheimische Kirchen und Reformations Historie..., Theil 2. Hildesheim.
- Schorn-Schutte, Luise. (1996). Evangelische Geistlichkeit in der Fruhneuzeit. Guttersloh: Gutersloher Verlagshaus.
- Zimmerman, Paul. (1926). Album Academiae Helmstadiensis, Band I. Hannover, p. 54.
