= Heinrich Meibom (doctor) =

German physician and scholar

Johann Heinrich Meibom
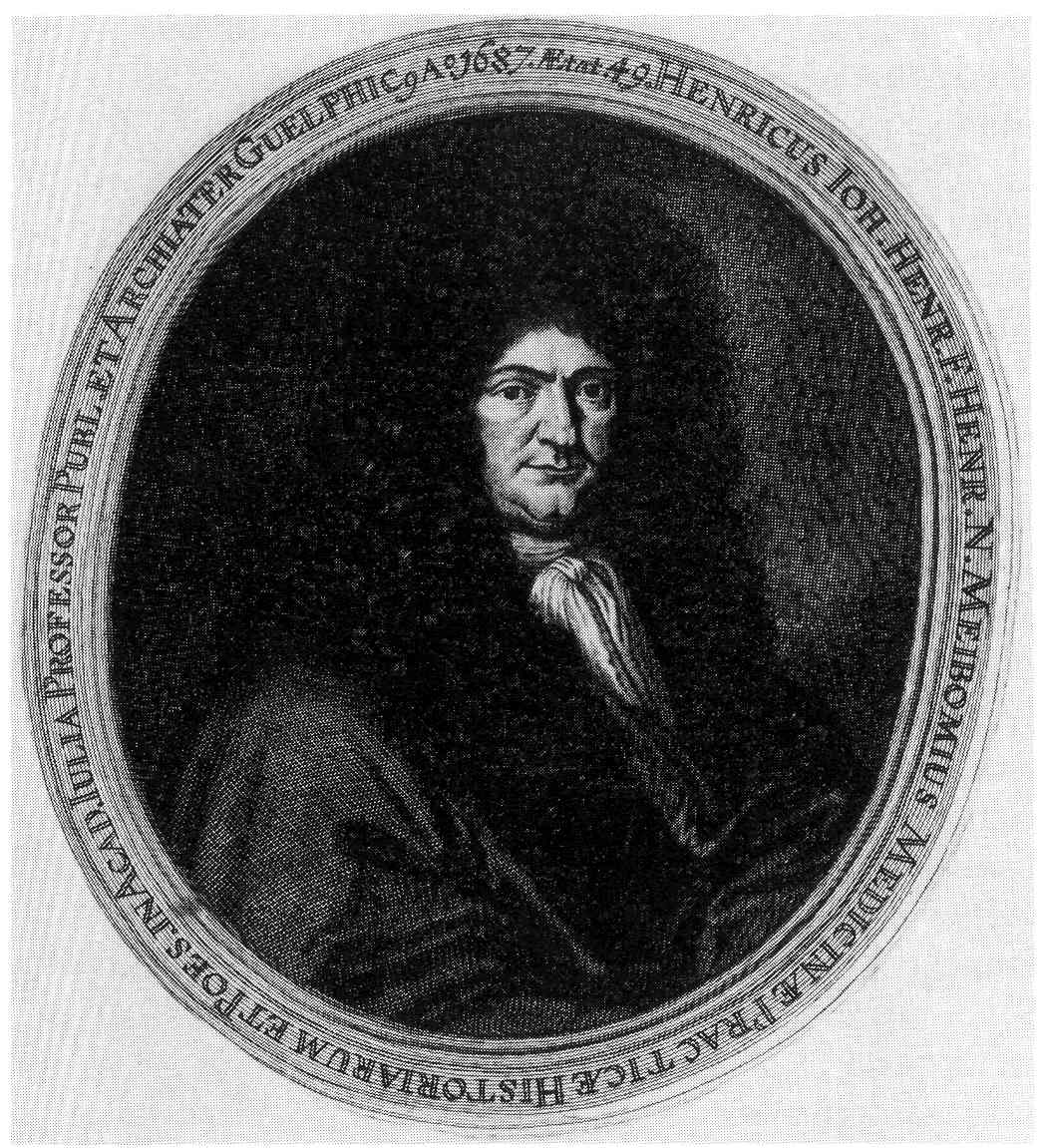
- Born: 29 June 1638; Lübeck, Germany
- Died: 26 March 1700 (aged 61); Helmstedt, Germany

Johann Heinrich Meibom (Latin: Iohannes Henricus Meibomius; 29 June 1638 in Lübeck – 26 March 1700 in Helmstedt) was a German physician and scholar.

== Life ==
Heinrich Meibom was the son of physician Johann Heinrich Meibom (1590-1655), who was the author of De Usu Flagrorum. He studied medicine at Helmstedt, Groningen and Leyden and afterwards traveled to Italy, France and England for scientific studies. He received his doctorate in 1663 in Angers (France) and in 1664 accepted a professorship in medicine at the University of Helmstedt. In 1678, he also became professor for history and poetry. He held these positions until his death in 1700.

His son, Brandanus Meibom, (1678-1740), was professor for Pathology, Semiotics, Botany and Medicine.

== Works ==
Meibom wrote 57 medical treatises. He is known for his discovery of the sebaceous glands in the eyelid that are named after him, the Meibomian glands.

Beyond that, he wrote Latin poetry, which he published with his grandfather of the same name, Heinrich Meibom: Parodiarum horatianarum libri III et sylvarum libri II, 1588, published as "Rerum germanicarum scriptores" in 1688.

(This article was partially translated from the German Wikipedia article: Heinrich Meibom (Mediziner) )
