= Christoph Heidmann =

German philologist and geographer

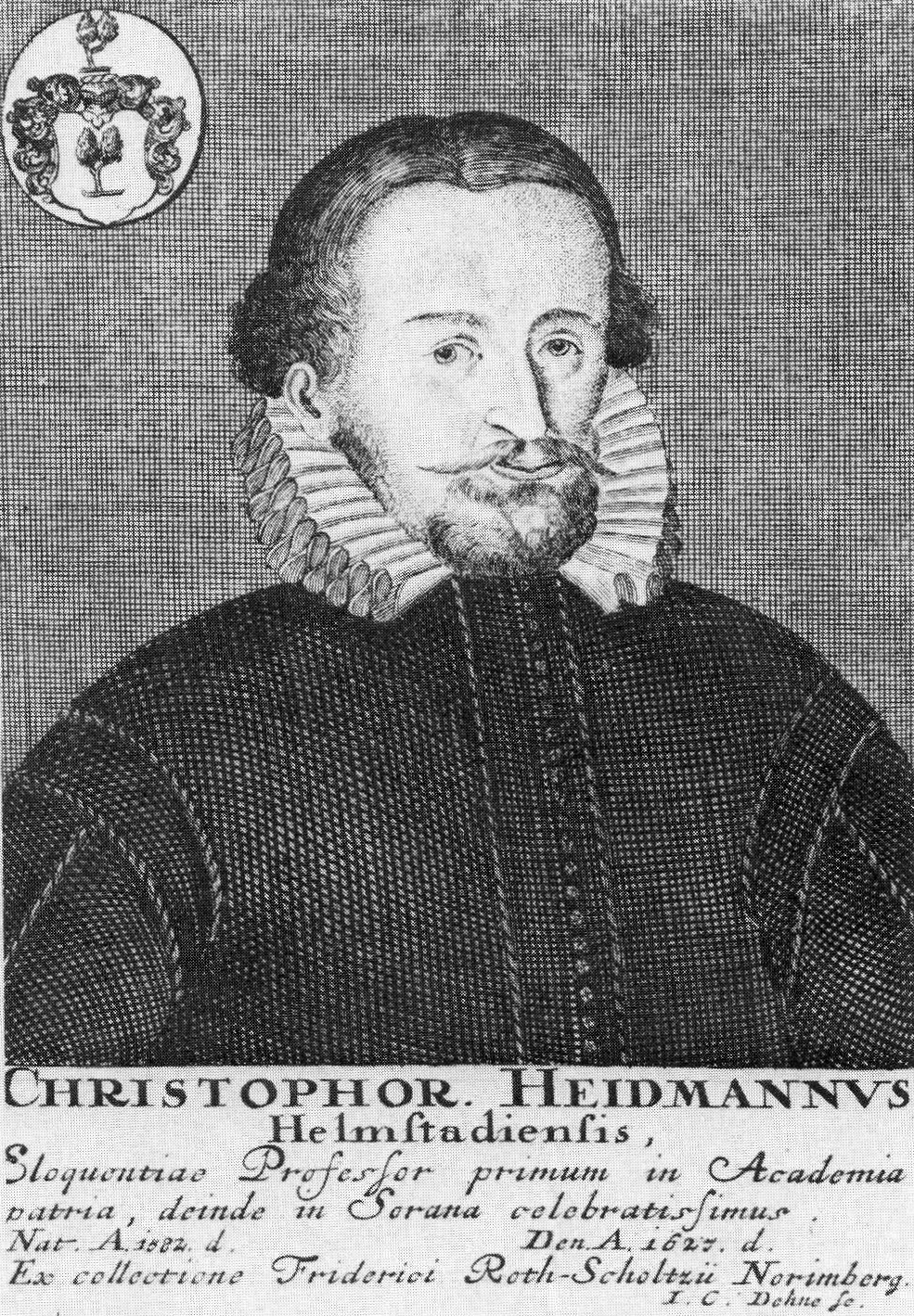
Christoph Heidmann

Christoph Heidmann (Latin Christophorus Heidmannus; * 1582 in Helmstedt (Bodenwerder?); † 1627 in Sorø, Denmark) was a German philologist and geographer.

== Life ==
Born and raised in Helmstedt (Bodenwerder?), Christoph Heidmann studied in Helmstedt from 1602 and in 1612 received a professorship in rhetoric at the University of Helmstedt (also known as the Academia Julia ). As a university professor, he introduced students such as Hermann Conring and Christoph Schrader to philology. Schrader was appointed to Heidmann's chair in 1636, a decade after Heidmann's resignation.

During the temporary closure of the university due to the plague and the turmoil of the Thirty Years' War in 1625/1626, Heidmann left his hometown and the Academia Julia. In 1626 he accepted a call from the Academia Sorana to Sorø in Denmark as a professor of oratory . He died in Sorø during his first semester.

Through his posthumously published works on the geography of Europe and Palestine, Christoph Heidmann is considered one of the founders of scientific geography. In 1624 his lecture on Palestine was the first of its kind in the German-speaking world.

== Works ==
- Disputatio Ethica De Fortitudine. Helmstedt 1616
- Oratio De Bibliotheca Julia Habita 1619. Helmstedt 1622
- Epitome Historica De Imperatoribus, Sive Caesaribus Augustis Romanorum. Helmstedt 1623
- Christophori Heidmani Europa. Sive Manuductionis Ad Geographiam Veterem Pars Prima. Helmstedt 1639 (postum)
- Christophori Heidmanni Palaestina Sive Terra Sancta. Helmstedt 1639 (postum; Digitalisat)

== Bibliography ==
- Ina Lommatzsch: Heidmann, Christopherus. In: Horst-Rüdiger Jarck, Dieter Lent u. a. (Hrsg.): Braunschweigisches Biographisches Lexikon – 8. bis 18. Jahrhundert. Appelhans Verlag, Braunschweig 2006, ISBN 3-937664-46-7, S. 309 f.
- Nebeneintrag in: Paul Zimmermann (1891). "Christoph Schrader" . Allgemeine Deutsche Biographie (in German). Vol. 32. Leipzig: Duncker & Humblot. pp. 422–425. (ADB). Band 32, Duncker & Humblot, Leipzig 1891, S. 422–425.
- Hans Haase: Die Universität Helmstedt 1576–1810. Bilder aus ihrer Geschichte. Jacobi-Verlag, Bremen/Wolfenbüttel 1976, ISBN 3-87447-052-0, S. 82.
