= Nolin map =

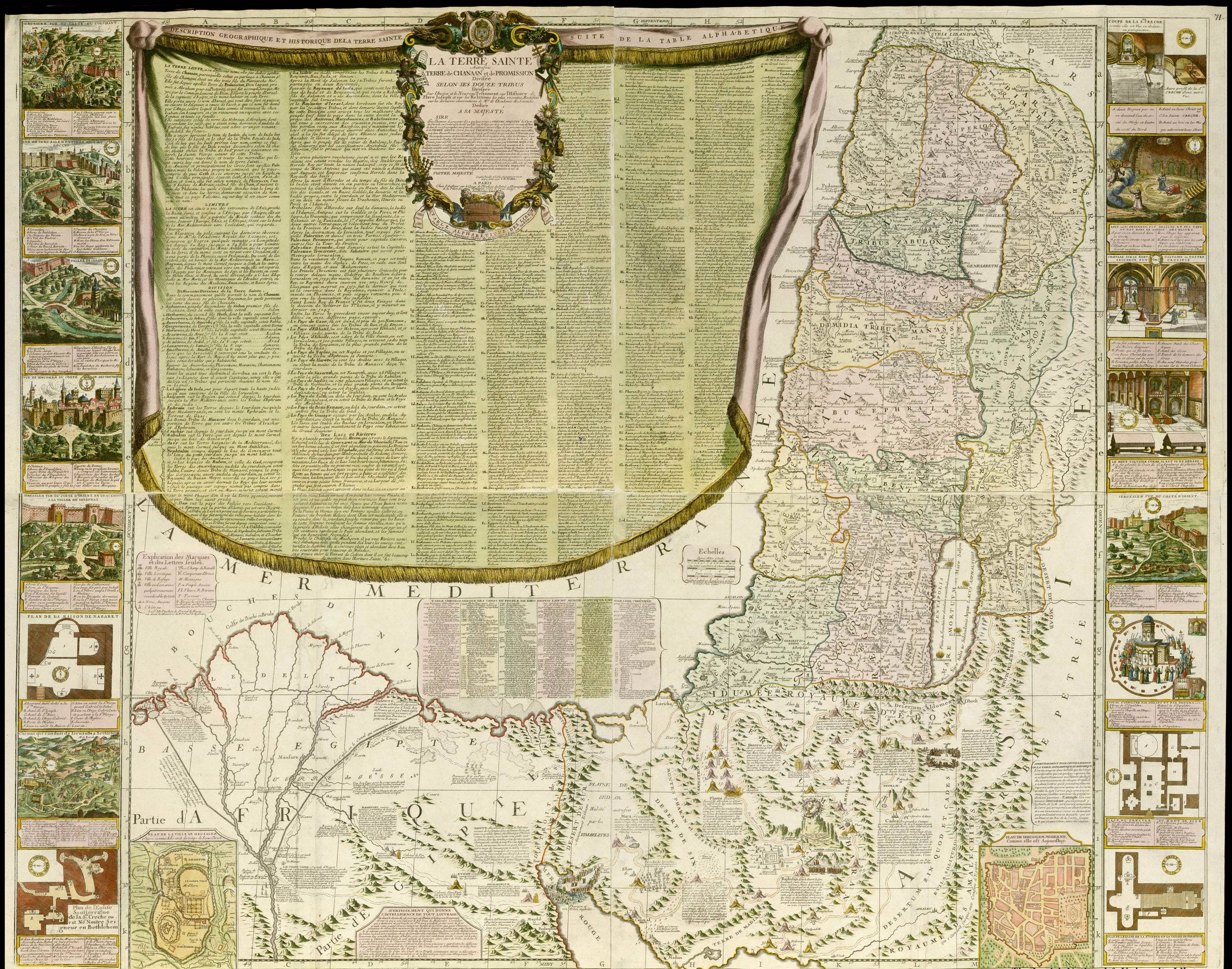

Nolin Map is a historic map of the Land of Canaan and the city of Jerusalem which was drawn by the French cartographer and geographer Jean-Baptiste Nolin in 1700.

Today the map is found within the Eran Laor maps collection in the National Library of Israel in Jerusalem.

== Description ==
The map is printed on four sheets. The Land of Canaan appears at the center of the map, the Mediterranean Sea at its top left side, the Dead Sea at its right, and a small map of the old city of Jerusalem at its bottom right - with illustrations of the old city's streets and the Temple Mount. A geographical and historical contextual description of the Land of Israel appears at the top left side, on top of the Mediterranean Sea surface. Both vertical sides of the map contain small images, depicting landscapes of holy cities as Jerusalem and Nazareth, and scenes within religious places.

The dimension of the map is 97.8 by 125 centimeters.
