= Helmstedt =

- Town
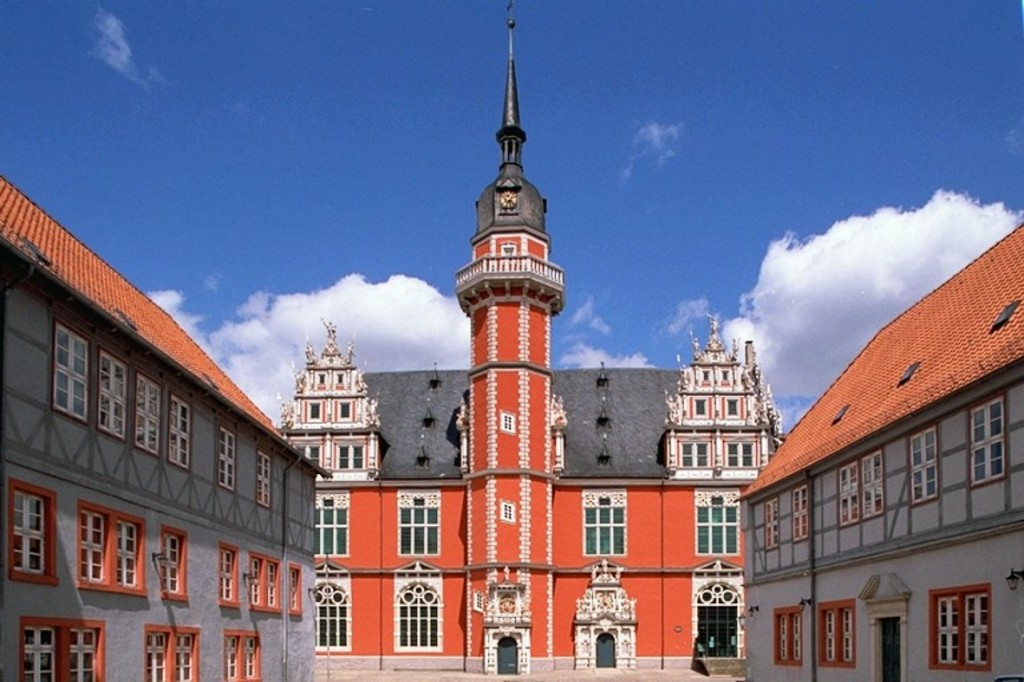
- Juleum Novum, building of the former University of Helmstedt

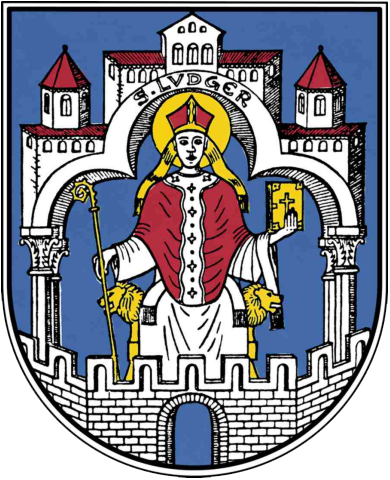
- Coat of arms

- Location of Helmstedt within Helmstedt district
- Interactive map of Helmstedt
- Location within Germany Location within Lower Saxony
- Coordinates: 52°13′41″N 11°00′38″E
- Country: Germany
- State: Lower Saxony
- District: Helmstedt
- First mentioned: 952
- Subdivisions: 8 Boroughs

Government
  - Mayor (2017–25): Wittich Schobert (CDU)

Area
  - Total: 66.74 km^{2} (25.77 sq mi)
- Elevation: 123 m (404 ft)

Population (2025-12-31)
  - Total: 25,048
  - Density: 375.3/km^{2} (972.0/sq mi)
- Time zone: UTC+01:00 (CET)
  - Summer (DST): UTC+02:00 (CEST)
- Postal codes: 38350
- Dialling codes: 05351
- Vehicle registration: HE
- Website: www.stadt-helmstedt.de

Helmstedt (German pronunciation: [ˈhɛlmˌʃtɛt]; Eastphalian: Helmstidde) is a town on the eastern edge of the German state of Lower Saxony. It is the capital of the District of Helmstedt. The historic university and Hanseatic city conserves an important monumental heritage of Romanesque and Renaissance buildings, as well as numerous timber framed houses. During the German partition the nearby Bundesautobahn 2 was the site of the Helmstedt–Marienborn border crossing, the most important on the former inner German border as starting point of the shortest land route between West Germany and West Berlin.

== Geography ==
Helmstedt is situated in a basin between the Elm and Lappwald hill ranges, at the transition area between the northern foothills of the Harz mountains and the North German Plain. It is surrounded by the Elm-Lappwald Nature Park. The town centre is located about 36 kilometres (22 mi) east of Braunschweig, 45 kilometres (28 mi) west of Magdeburg, and 90 kilometres (56 mi) east of the state capital Hanover.

The municipal area includes the localities of Barmke and Emmerstedt, both incorporated by a 1974 administrative reform, and Büddenstedt, incorporated in 2017, as well as the resort town of Bad Helmstedt, about 3.5 kilometres (2.2 mi) east of the town centre. Helmstedt currently has about 25,000 inhabitants (2015).

== History ==
The settlement in the Duchy of Saxony was first mentioned as Helmonstede in a 952 deed issued by the German king Otto I. In former times also called Helmstädt, the town developed in the vicinity of the Benedictine St. Ludger's Abbey that was founded around 800 by Saint Liudger as a mission station. Helmstedt's town privileges were documented in 1247. It belonged to the Abbacy of Werden until 1490, when it was bought by the Duchy of Brunswick-Lüneburg. From 1576 to 1810, the University of Helmstedt was located here.

From 1807 the town was part of the Napoleonic Kingdom of Westphalia, from 1815 it was part of the Duchy of Brunswick, and from 1871 it was part of the German Empire. During World War I, in 1916–1917, Germany operated a special prisoner-of-war camp for ethnic Polish officers from the Russian Army, with the aim of subjecting them to propaganda and conscripting them into a planned German-controlled Polish army to fight against Russia (Poland was partitioned between Germany, Russia and Austria at the time). In 1918, French officers were also detained in this camp, their return began in January 1919.

From the late 1940s to 1990, the town was the site of a major border crossing between the Federal Republic of Germany and the German Democratic Republic. The main rail and autobahn route between West Germany and West Berlin, across the GDR, began at the Helmstedt–Marienborn border crossing, also known as Checkpoint Alpha.

== Transport ==
The town lies on the Brunswick-Magdeburg railway.

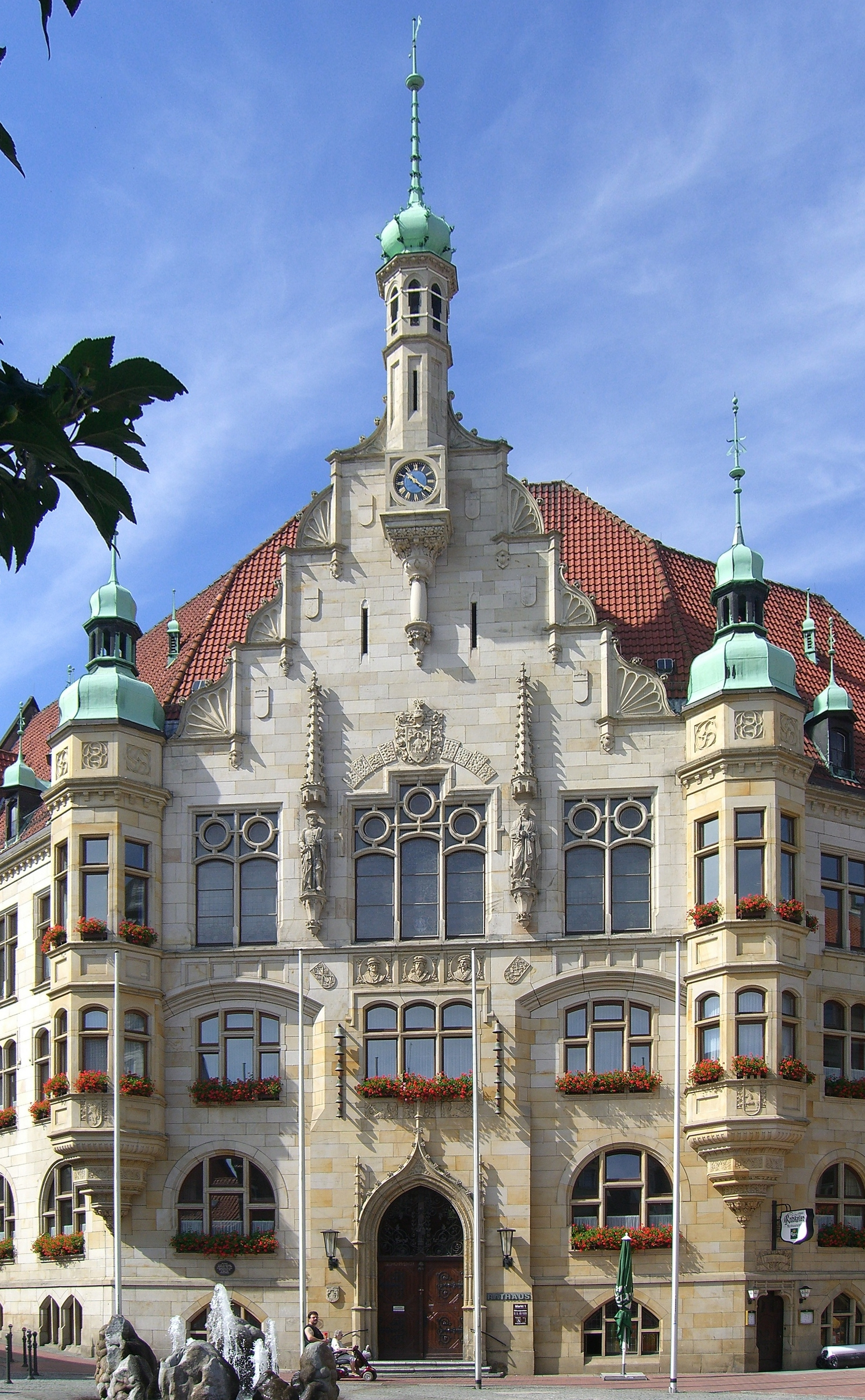
Mayor's office (built 1904 - 1906)

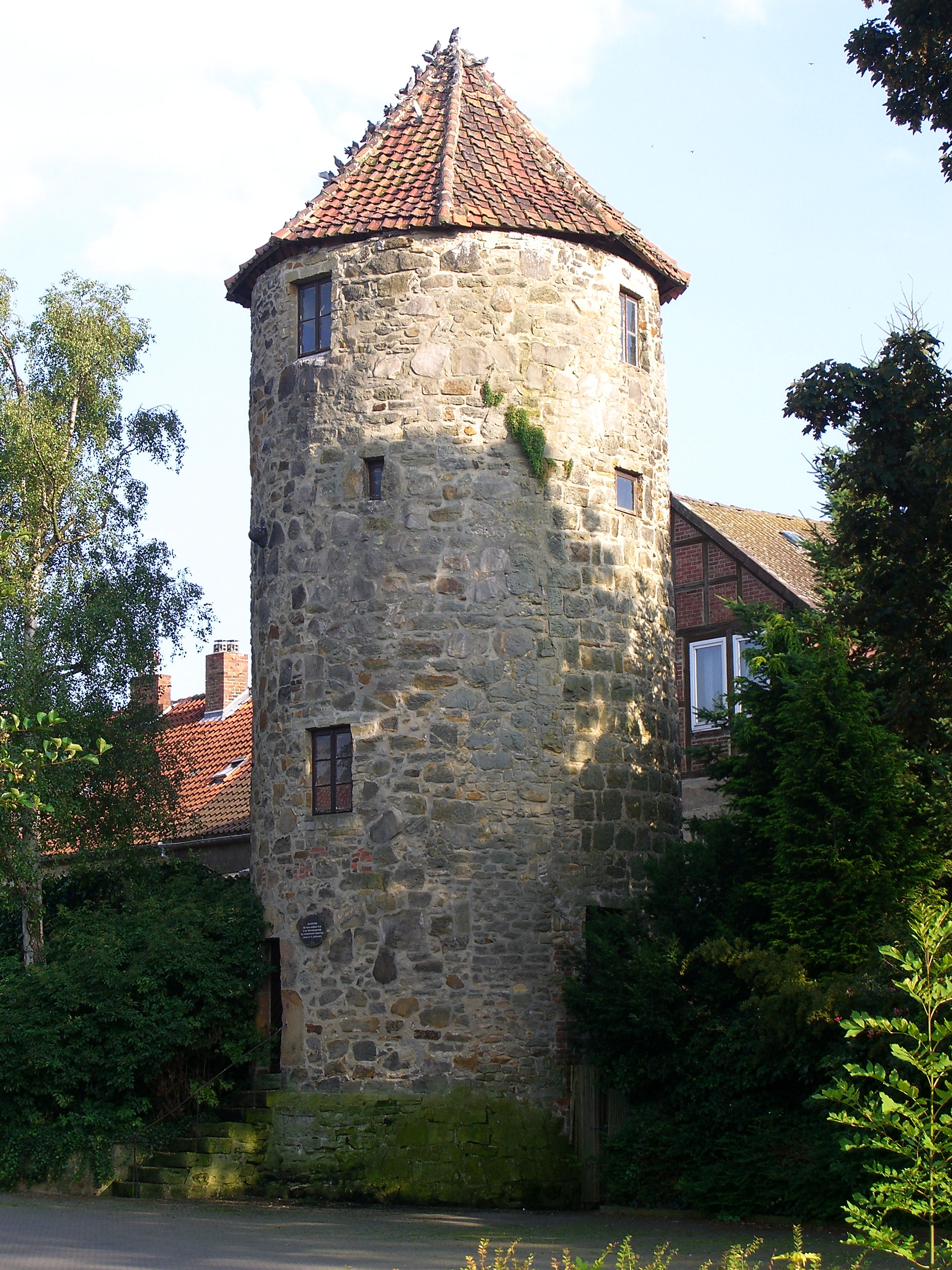
The "Owl Tower" of the medieval town wall

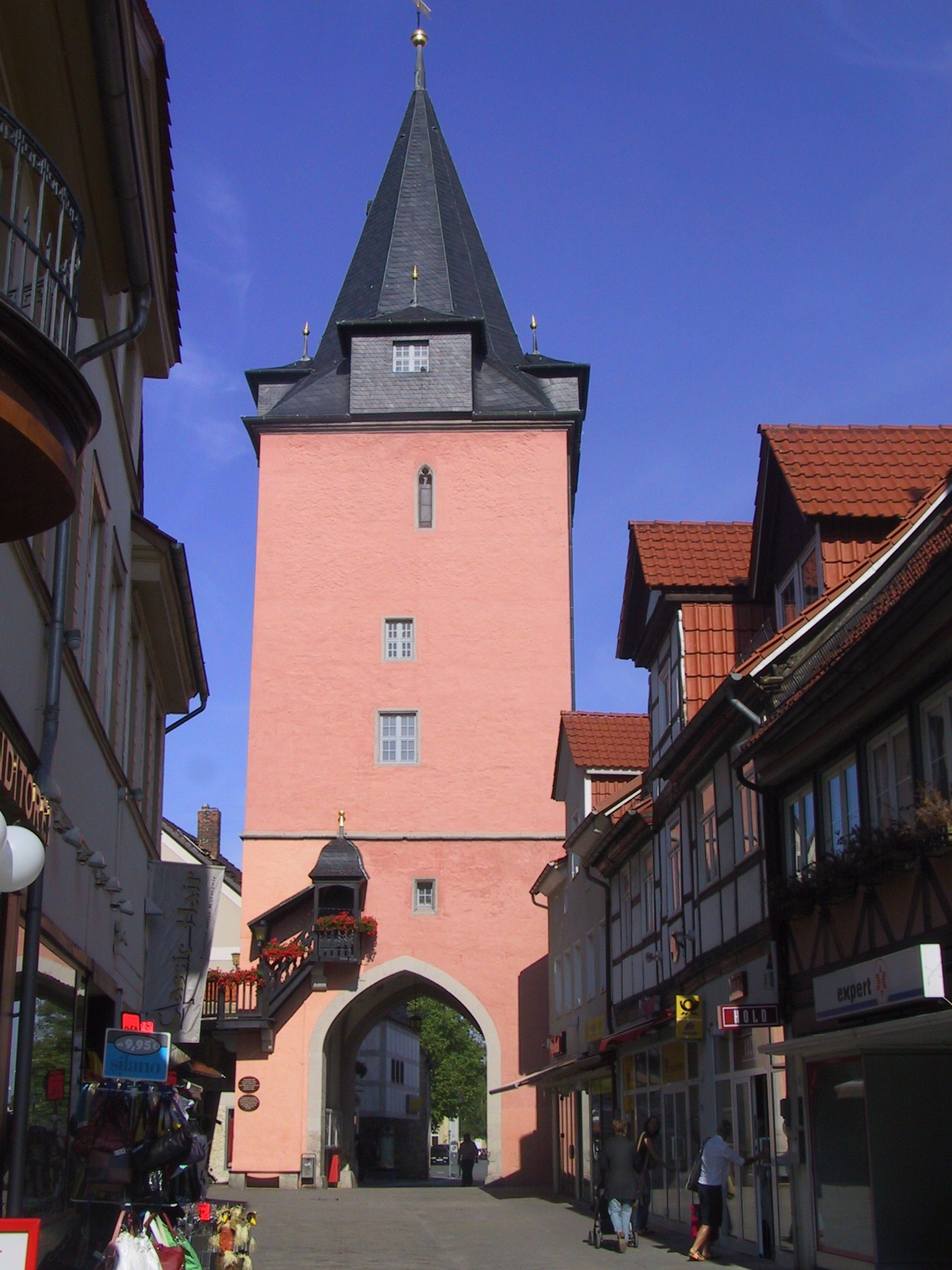
The Hausmannsturm of Helmstedt

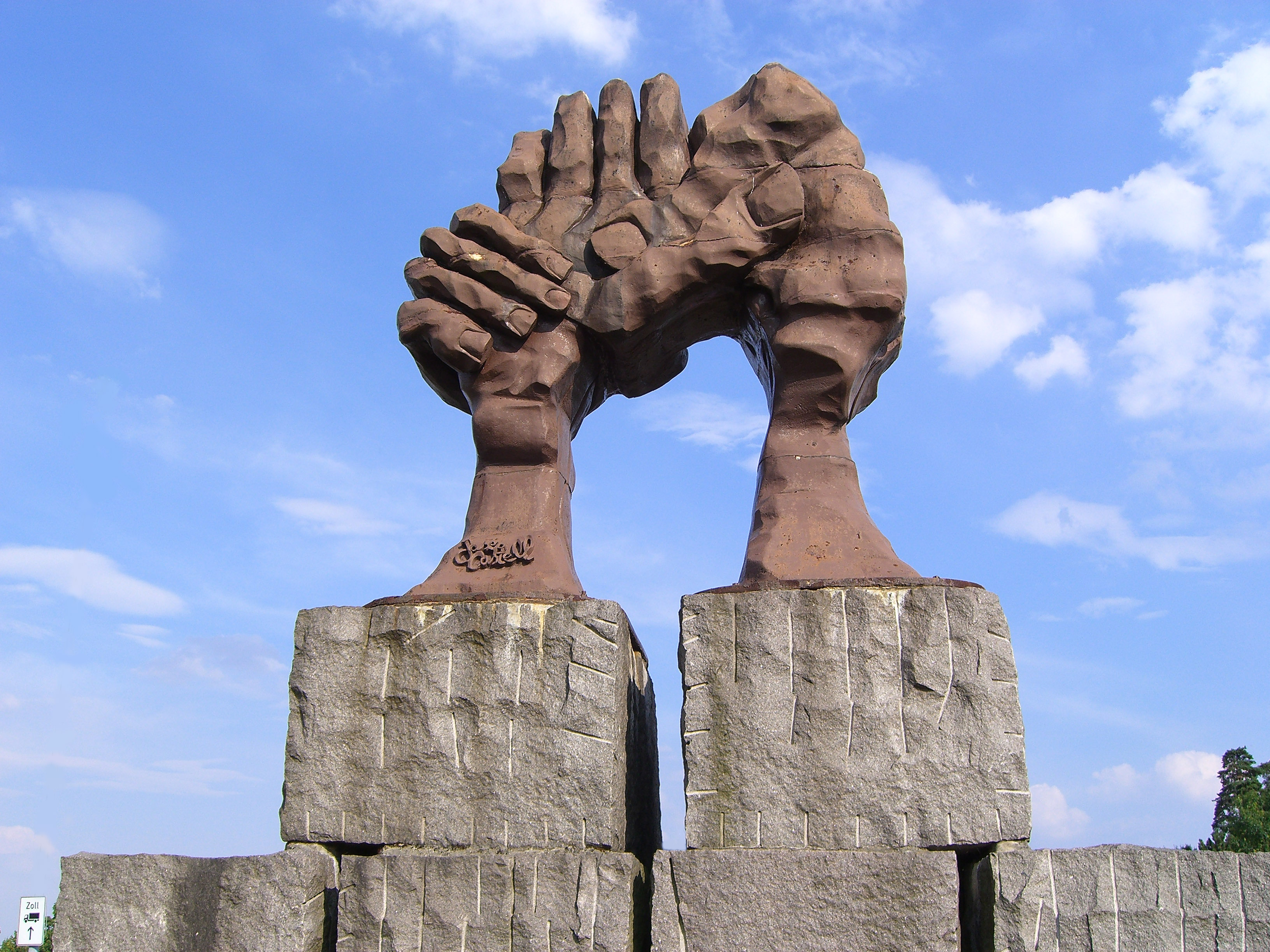
Memorial to the former border between West and East Germany

== Notable people ==
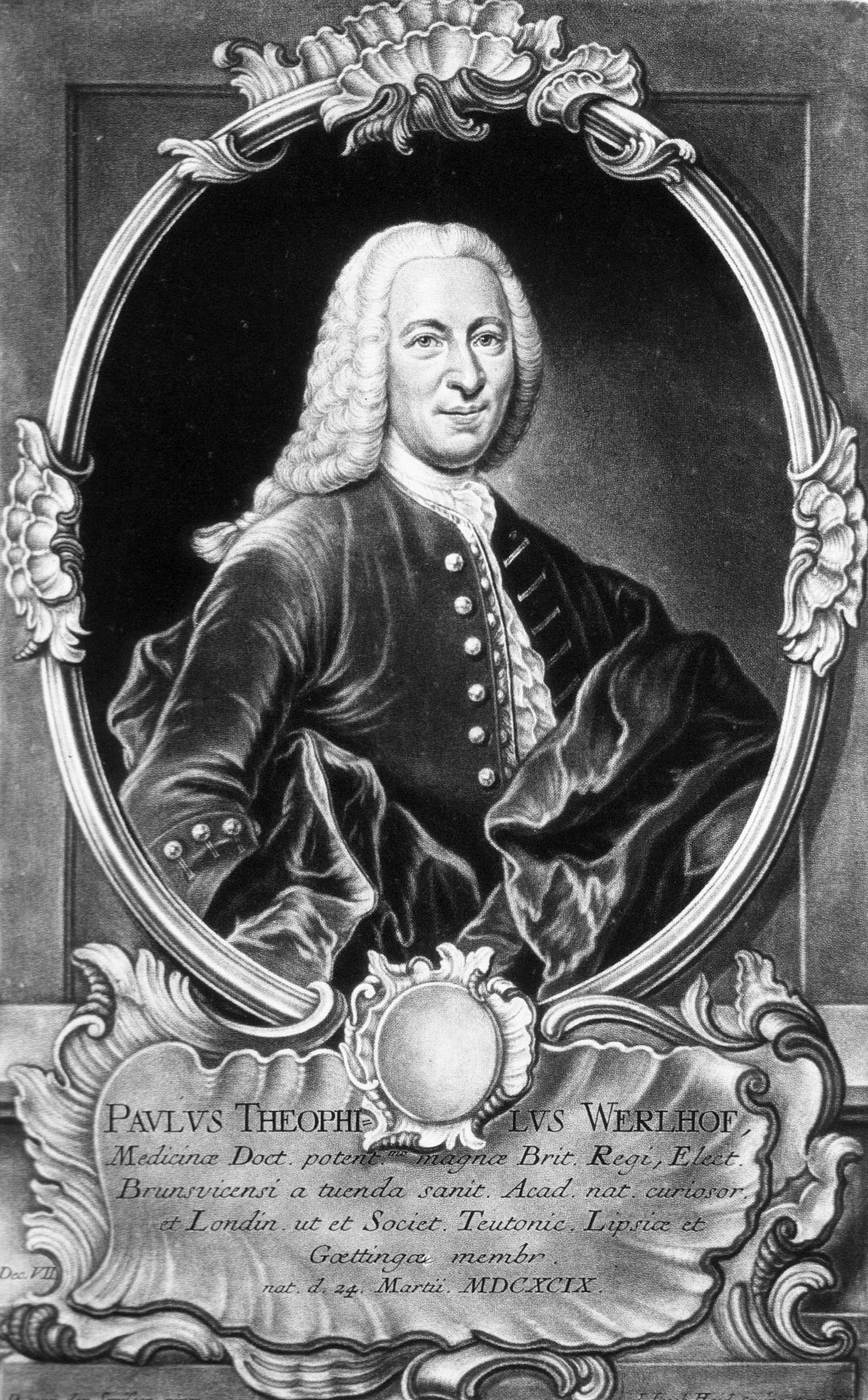
Paul Gottlieb Werlhof

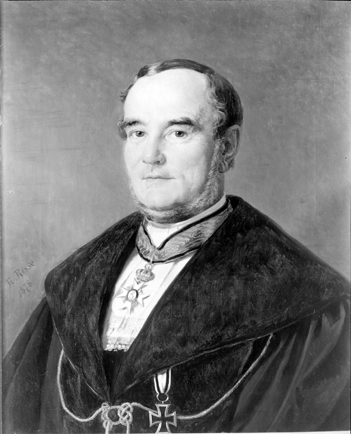
Victor von Bruns, 1878

- Heinrich Meibom (1555–1625 in Helmstedt), historian and poet.
- Johann Heinrich Meibom (1638–1700 in Helmstedt) physician and scholar.
- Paul Gottlieb Werlhof (1699–1767), Royal Hanoverian court physician and poet
- Lorenz Florenz Friedrich von Crell (1744–1816), chemist; he published the first periodical journal on chemistry.
- Justus Christian Henry Helmuth (1745–1825), a German-American Lutheran clergyman.
- Johann Andreas Graeffer (1746–1802), botanist and nurseryman; introduced exotic plants to British gardens
- Anton August Heinrich Lichtenstein (1753–1816), zoologist and librarian
- Theodor von Schubert (1758–1825), astronomer and geographer.
- Johann Christian Friedrich Heyer (1793–1873), the first missionary sent abroad by Lutherans in the US
- Georg Fein (1803–1869), journalist and democratic politician of the Vormärz period.
- Ernst Ludwig Theodor Henke (1804–1872), a theologian and historian.
- Franz Heinrich Ludolf Ahrens (1809–1881), philologist.
- Friedrich Wilhelm Schneidewin (1810–1856), classical scholar.
- Victor von Bruns (1812–1883), physician and plastic surgeon
- Rudolf Leuckart (1822–1898), biologist and founder of parasitology
- Hans Krebs (1898–1945), military officer and chief of staff of the Wehrmacht
- Asta Hampe (1907– 2003), engineer, physicist, economist and statistician
- Peter Feldmann (born 1958), politician, mayor (SPD) of Frankfurt since 2012
- Stefan Rinke (born 1965), historian and specialist in Latin American history, studied locally
- Christoph Lütge (born 1969), philosopher and economist, works on business ethics & AI ethics.
- Andree Wiedener (born 1970), footballer, played 395 games
- Josefine Paul (born 1982), politician
- Nico Göhler (born 2003), racing driver

In addition, see the list of famous students and professors of the University of Helmstedt.

== Twin towns – sister cities ==
Helmstedt is twinned with:

- Albuquerque, United States
- Chard, England, United Kingdom
- Fiuggi, Italy
- Haldensleben, Germany
- Orăştie, Romania
- Svietlahorsk, Belarus
- Vitré, France
