= Heinrich Meibom (poet) =

German historian and poet

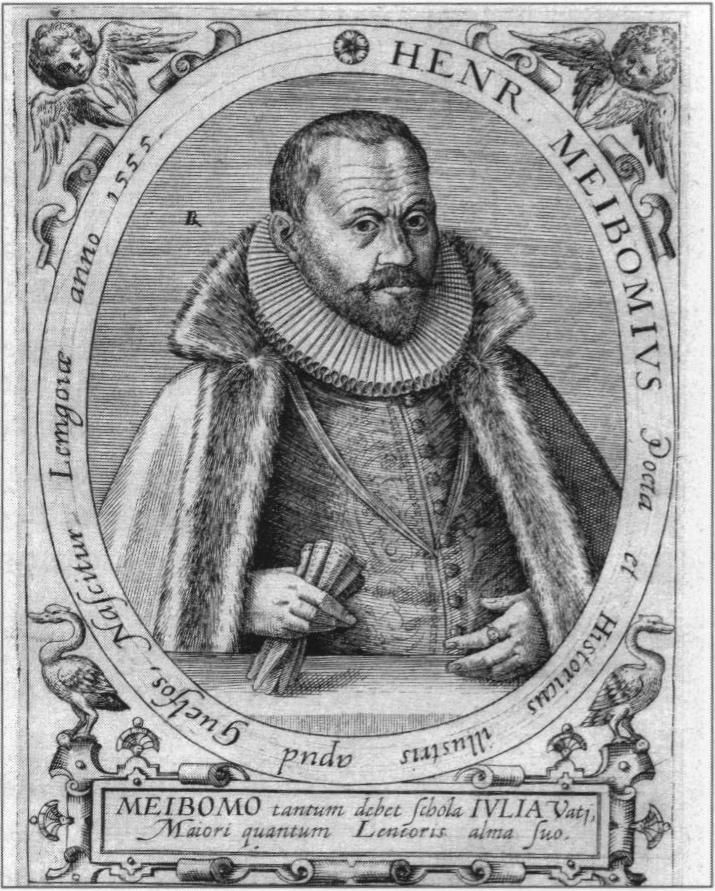
Heinrich Meibom.

Heinrich Meibom (4 December 1555 – 20 September 1625), German historian and poet, was born at Barntrup in Westphalia.

He held the chair of history and poetry at Helmstedt from 1583 until his death. He was a writer of Latin verses (Parodiarum horatianarum Libri III et sylvarum Libri II, 1588); and his talents in this direction were recognized by the emperor Rudolph II, who ennobled him; but his claim to be remembered rests on his services in elucidating the medieval history of Germany.

His Opuscula historica ad res Germanicus spectantia was edited and published in 1660 by his grandson, Heinrich Meibom (1638–1700), who was professor of medicine who wrote 57 medical treaties and then of history and poetry at Helmstedt, and incorporated his grandfather's work with his own Rerum germanicarum scriptures (1688).
