= Burchard of Mount Sion =

German priest, Dominican friar, pilgrim and author

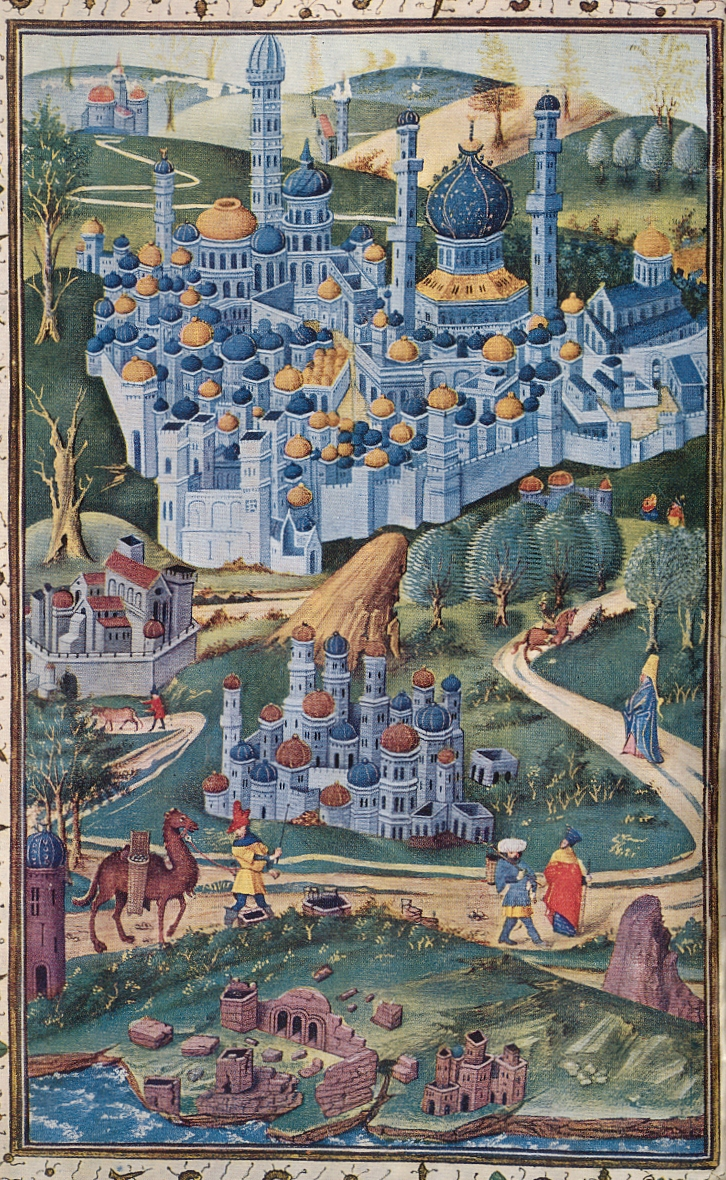
View of Jerusalem from a 1455 copy of Descriptio Terrae Sanctae

Burchard of Mount Sion (Latin: Frater Burchardus, also misnamed Brocard or Bocard; fl. late 13th century), was a German priest, Dominican friar, pilgrim and author probably from Magdeburg in northern Germany, who travelled to the Middle East at the end of the 13th century. There he wrote his book called: Descriptio Terrae Sanctae or "Description of the Holy Land" which is considered to be of "extraordinary importance".

== Descriptio Terrae Sanctae ==
It is the most detailed account of the Holy Land from the thirteenth century. It is described as having belonged to a class of its own among medieval descriptions of the Holy Land. Approximately 100 medieval and early modern manuscripts are known today, some of which include maps and diagrams.

The long version, unlike the short version, contains additional descriptions that illustrate Burchard's journey from Europe to the Holy Land and back. He travelled to Mamluk Egypt and Angevin Sicily, among other places, and in two manuscripts of the long version he shares his observations during the ascent of the volcanic mountain Vulcano. Burchard was in Palestine for 10 years between 1274 and 1284. He then visited Armenia where he wrote about the court of the king of Cilician Armenia, Levon II. Burchard described the country of Cilician Armenia as submitted to Mongol domination, and explains that Mongols were present at the royal Armenian court:

Actually, I spent three weeks with the king of Armenia and Cilicia, who had with him some Tartars. The rest of the attendants were Christians, to the number of about 200. I saw them gather to go to church, listen to the office, bend the knee, and pray with devotion.

— Burchard of Mount Sion, 1282.

Having completed his business there, Burchard sailed to Cyprus, where, he tells us, he was kindly received by Henry II of Jerusalem the last ruling and full titular King of Jerusalem (after the fall of Acre on 28 May 1291, this title became empty) and also ruled as King of Cyprus.

In 1455 Philip the Good Duke of Burgundy ordered his secretary, Jean Miélot, canon of Lille and miniaturist to translate the Descriptio Terrae Sanctae, by Burchard of Mount Sion (1283). The translation was embellished by him with beautiful miniatures of Jerusalem copies of which are held in Bibliothèque nationale de France, Royal Library of Belgium and the Bodleian Library, Oxford. For Burchard's Jerusalem, the map of Jerusalem by Marino Sanudo in his Liber Secretorum Fidelium Crucis. An English translation of the original longer manuscript is provided in Denys Pringle's collection of translated pilgrimage texts part of the Crusade Texts in Translation series published by Ashgate.

Burchard is one of the last pilgrims to travel to the Holy Land and write a full report before the fall of the Latin Kingdom in 1291. According to Jaroslav Folda the account is important not only because of its systematic and yet selective content, but also because of the extent of the actualia included in his discussion.
