= Spiral folds of cystic duct =

Details
- System: Digestive system

Identifiers
- Latin: plicae spirales ductus cystici, valvulae spirales

Spiral folds of cystic duct (also known as the spiral mucosal folds, spiral valves of Cina, Heister valves, Amussat valve, or Cina valves) are a series of crescenteric, spirally arranged mucosal folds in the proximal part of the cystic duct.

== Anatomy ==
The folds are 2-10 in number. They project into the lumen of the duct. They are continuous with the folds of the neck of the gallbladder. They are arranged in a somewhat spiral manner.

=== Structure ===
The spiral valves are supported by underlying smooth muscle fibers.

== Function ==
The function of the valves is not known. Since the structures' discovery, various functions have been proposed, including the structural support to the cystic duct, and moderation of the speed of passage of bile through the duct in either direction Their role has been commonly ascribed to the regulation of bile flow, however, they may instead maintain patency of the duct (i.e. keep the duct open) as the duct is thin and tortuous and thus prone to kinking; the observation that the folds are more prominent in younger individuals in whom the duct is also thinner supports this hypothesis.

== Clinical significance ==
The presence of the spiral folds, in combination with the tortuosity of the cystic duct, makes endoscopic cannulation and catheterization of the cystic duct extremely difficult. The valves of Cina are susceptible to lacerations and were once a serious obstacle to the surgical canalization, which has since been overcome by newer technologies.

=== Imaging ===
On ultrasound, valves of Cina are echogenic.
