= Saint-Martin Abbey, Tournai =

Coordinates: 50°36′11″N 3°23′13″E

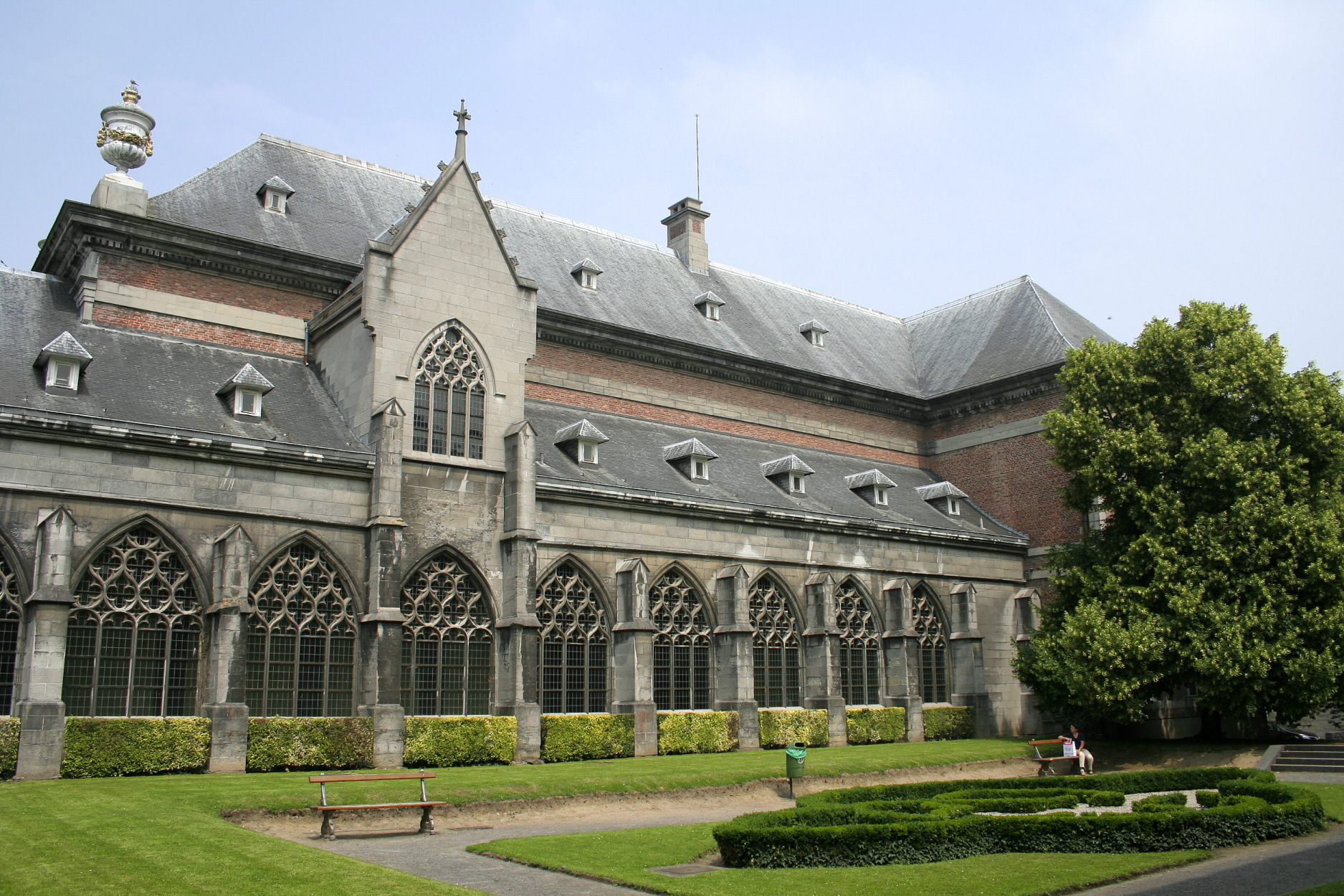
Preserved side of medieval pledge corridor

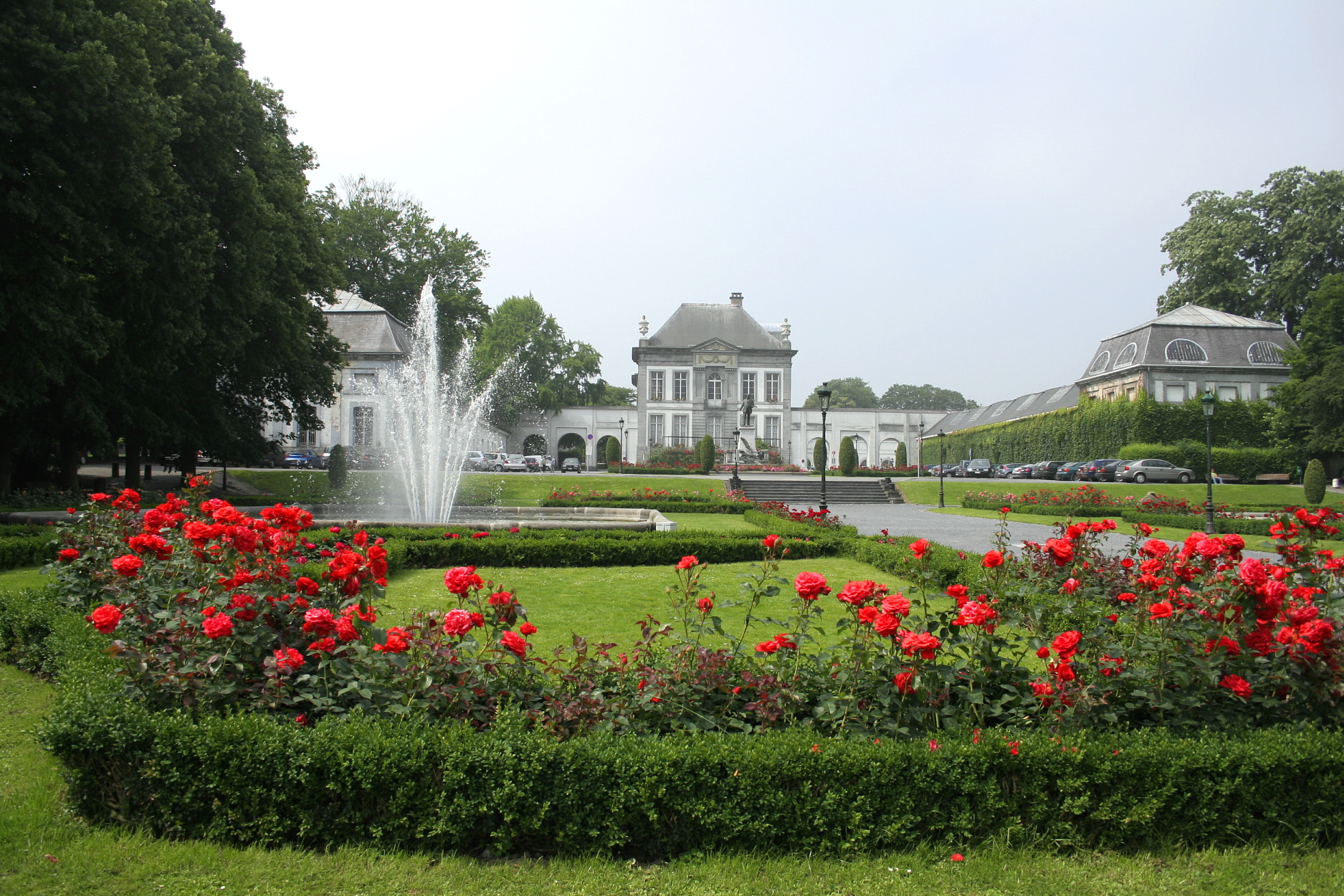
Side of the abbot's palace, now city hall

The Saint-Martin Abbey (French: abbaye Saint-Martin) in the historic center of Tournai, in the Wallonia region of Belgium is a former Benedictine abbey, dating back to the 7th century. It was re-established in the late 11th century by Odo of Tournai and it immediately became an important Benedictine settlement. A fire devastated the abbey in 1340 in the Siege of Tournai during the Hundred Years' War. It was later rebuilt by renowned architect Laurent-Benoît Dewez in the 1760s. The abbey was dissolved during the French Revolution in 1796 and the buildings were largely demolished except for the abbot's palace, which today serves as the town hall.

== History ==
Even before the tolerance edict of Emperor Constantine, Saint Piatus is said to have come to preach in Tornacum. From the 4th century, there was a Christian presence in the city. A new evangelization began in the 7th century with Saint-Éloi, bishop of Noyon and Tournai. During this operation, according to tradition, he founded a monastery dedicated to Martin of Tours in Tournai. The Norman raids put an end to monastic life.

Odo of Orléans was appointed at the cathedral school of Tournai in 1087. When this cultivated man decided to retire to lead a more intense spiritual life, Bishop Radbod II and the canons tried to keep him in the city by donating to him, on May 2, 1092, the remains of the ruined Convent of St. Martin, where, with a few disciples, Odo founded first a canonical and soon a monastic community. The transition from the Rule of Augustine to the Regula Benedicti occurred in 1095 on the advice of Aymericus, abbot of Anchin. Odo was again elected abbot.

Under Odo's leadership, the abbey flourished. It had about 70 monks in 1105. Herman of Tournai, a pupil of Odo, became abbot and historian. Rodulphus directed a workshop with twelve copyists, who handed down many works of antiquity. The abbey also prospered on a secular level. At the end of the 13th century, it had about a hundred monks who managed a vast estate and had founded no less than forty priories. It owned forests, some twenty mills and jurisdiction over several towns.

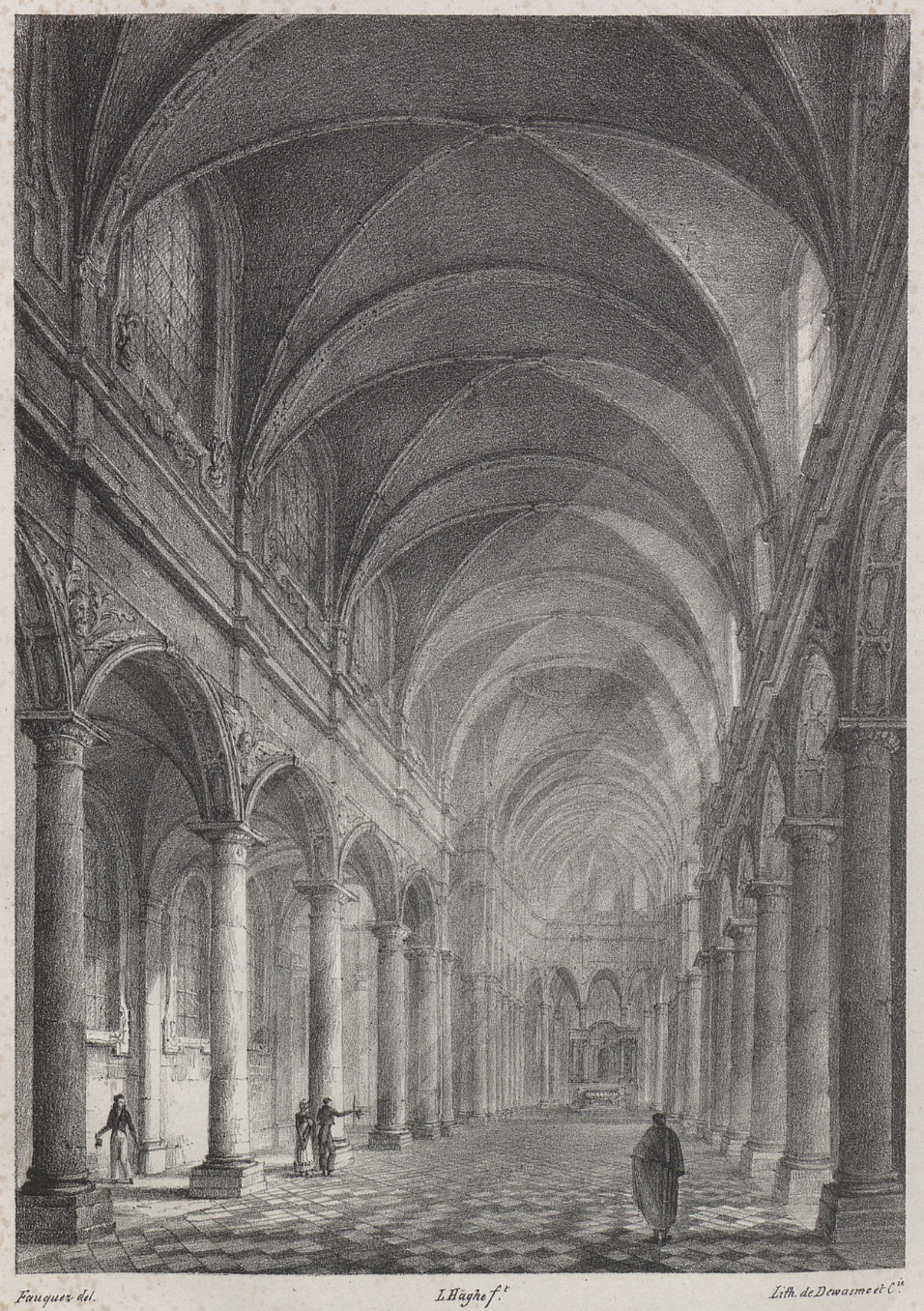
Interior of the abbey

The early 14th century was a time of great crisis. Poor management and large expenditures led Pope John XXII to investigate in 1332. He is documented to have blessed the abbey on October 25, 1332. The abbot and several monks were excommunicated. A new abbot, the chronicler Gilles Li Muisis (Le Muisit), was appointed and soon began to play a part in temporarlily restoring some of the secular prestige of the abbey. The Siege of Tournai during the Hundred Years' War devastated the abbey and the harvest of the monks in 1340 and made it impossible to continue.

Under Abbot Robert Delezenne, St. Martin's Abbey was radically rebuilt, designed by renowned architect Laurent-Benoît Dewez. The construction of the palace commenced in 1763.

The French Revolution and its excesses led to the dissolution of the monastery in 1796.

The buildings were largely demolished, though the luxurious abbot's residence was spared. The city council of Tournai moved there provisionally in 1809, to be permanently installed in 1830, when Belgium became independent. The building and surrounding buildings suffered greatly from the bombing of May 1940.

== Notable people ==
=== Abbots ===
- Odo of Tournai, the first abbot
- Herman of Tournai († 1147), third abbot from 1127 to 1137 and chronicler of the abbey
- Gilles Li Muisis (1272-1353), poet and chronicler
- Jacques Muevin (1296-1339), chronicler
- Dom Mathieu Fiévet (14th century), professor of canon law in Paris
- Giulio de' Medici, future Pope Clement VII, abbot in commendam from 1519 to 1523
- Jacques De Maquais, abbot from 1583 to 1604, author of ascetic and theological books
- Robert Delezenne, last abbot

=== Monks ===
- Ailbertus of Antoing was an Augustinian canon under Odo and later founded the Abbey of Rolduc.
- Amand Duchâtel began as a monk at St. Martin's Abbey and then became prior of Saint-Sauveur in Anchin and then abbot of St. Richtrudis and St. Peter in Marchiennes.
- Alulfus, singer and author of a Liber gregorialis (12th century).
