= University of Helmstedt =

University

Coordinates: 52°13′45″N 11°00′31″E

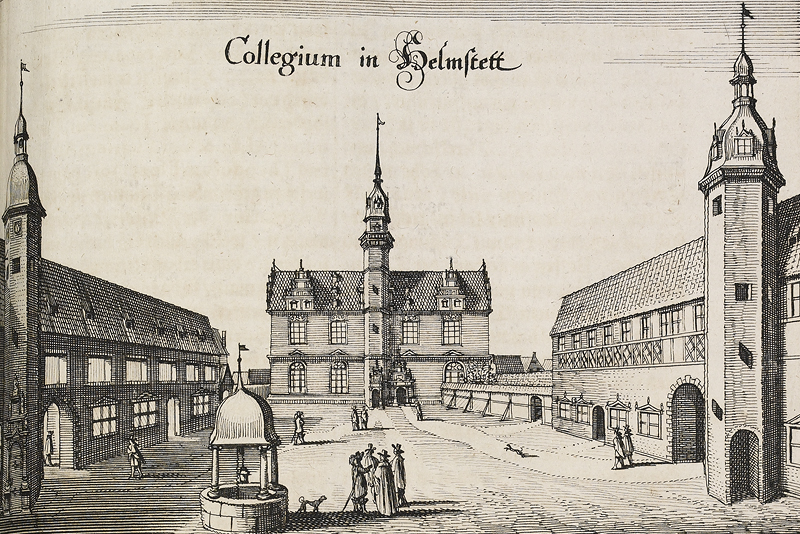
University of Helmstedt in the 17th century

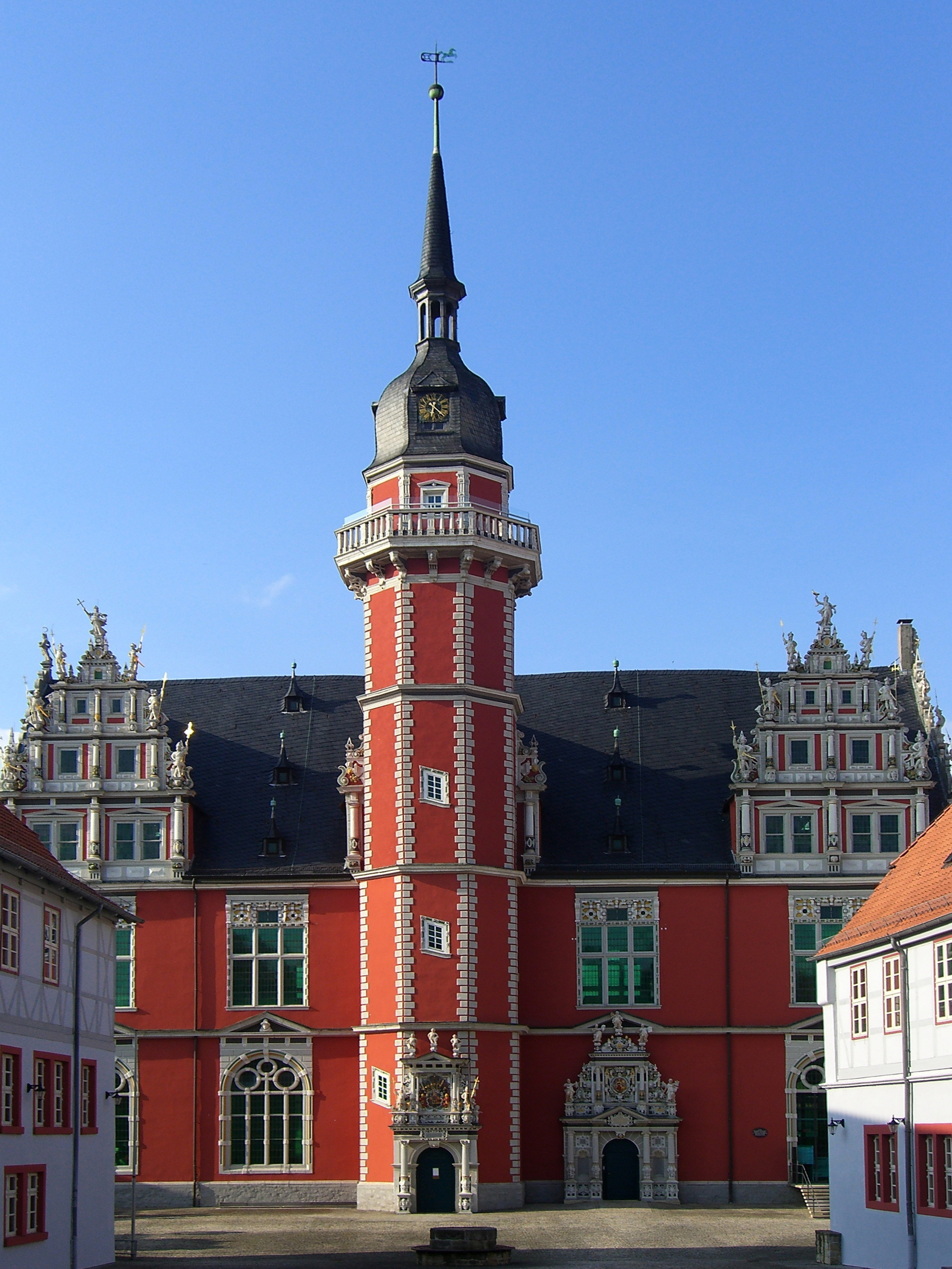
The Juleum in Helmstedt, historical great auditorium of the University, built in 1592 in Weser Renaissance architecture

The University of Helmstedt (German: Universität Helmstedt; official Latin name: Academia Julia, "Julius University") was a university in Helmstedt in the Duchy of Brunswick-Wolfenbüttel that existed from 1576 until 1810.

== History ==
Founded by and named after Duke Julius of Brunswick-Wolfenbüttel on 15 October 1576, the first university of the duchy and the first Protestant university of the northern Holy Roman Empire quickly became one of the largest German universities. In order to train pastors and administrators for work in the Lutheran churches, the duchy needed a university of its own. In 1575, Julius obtained the Emperor's permission to open a university in Helmstedt. One year later the first lectures started. The princes of Wolfenbüttel held the office of the rector, starting with Julius' 12-year-old son John Henry.

Tilemann Heshusius was an important early Lutheran theologian at Helmstedt. He developed a clergy network in the region that supported other Helmstedt professors, including Daniel Hofmann, Gottfried Schulter, Basilius Sattler, and Tilemann's son, Heinrich Heshusius.

The university developed four faculties for theology, law, medicine and philosophy including the seven liberal arts. The great auditorium, the Juleum Novum, was erected in 1592.

In the late 18th century, Helmstedt lost popularity to newer universities, such as the University of Göttingen. It was closed in 1810 on initiative of Johannes von Müller, director of public instruction in the Kingdom of Westphalia.

== Notable people ==
=== Notable faculty ===
- Giordano Bruno, philosophy
- Georgius Calixtus, theology
- Hermann Conring, natural philosophy and rhetoric, medicine, politics (in succession)
- Hermann von der Hardt, oriental languages
- Christoph Heidmann, geographer
- Lorenz Heister, medicine
- Tilemann Heshusius, theology
- Anton August Heinrich Lichtenstein, oriental languages
- Duncan Liddel, mathematics (from 1591 to 1607)
- Heinrich Meibom, history and poetry
- Johann Friedrich Pfaff, mathematics
- Wilhelm Abraham Teller, theology

=== Notable alumni ===
- Caspar Abel, theologian
- Valens Acidalius, writer
- Anton Wilhelm Amo, first black student in Europe
- Johann Arndt, theologian
- Christian Heinrich Bünger, anatomist
- Sethus Calvisius, musician
- Joachim Heinrich Campe, writer
- David Caspari, theologian
- Carl Friedrich Gauss, mathematician
- Wilhelm Gesenius, philologist
- Carl Benedict Hase, classicist
- Hoffmann von Fallersleben, writer
- Johann Georg Jacobi, writer
- Augustus Quirinus Rivinus (August Bachmann), physician and botanist

== See also ==
- List of early modern universities in Europe
