= Cartography of Israel =

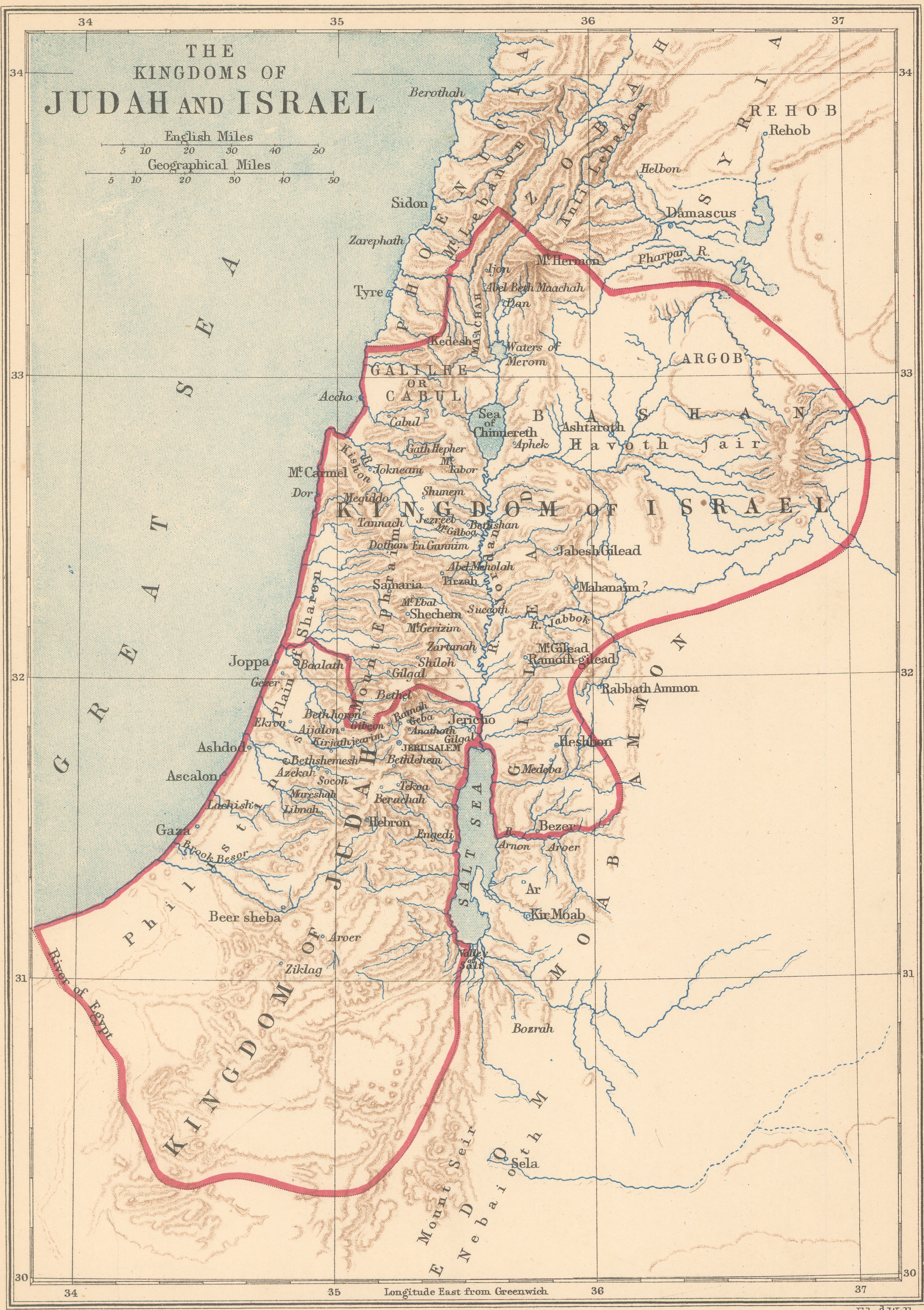
The Kingdoms of Judah and Israel, produced by Edward Weller c. 1890

1925 map of "Eretz-Israel Palestine"

The cartography of Israel is the depiction of the historical mapping and map creation of the region known historically as Eretz Yisrael, or the Land of Israel, Kingdom of Israel (Samaria), through to modern Israel.

== Defining borders of present day Israel ==
Prior to the declaration of Israel in 1948, the UN proposed a United Nations Partition Plan for Palestine based on the location of land legally purchased and used to create Jewish Settlements in the area.

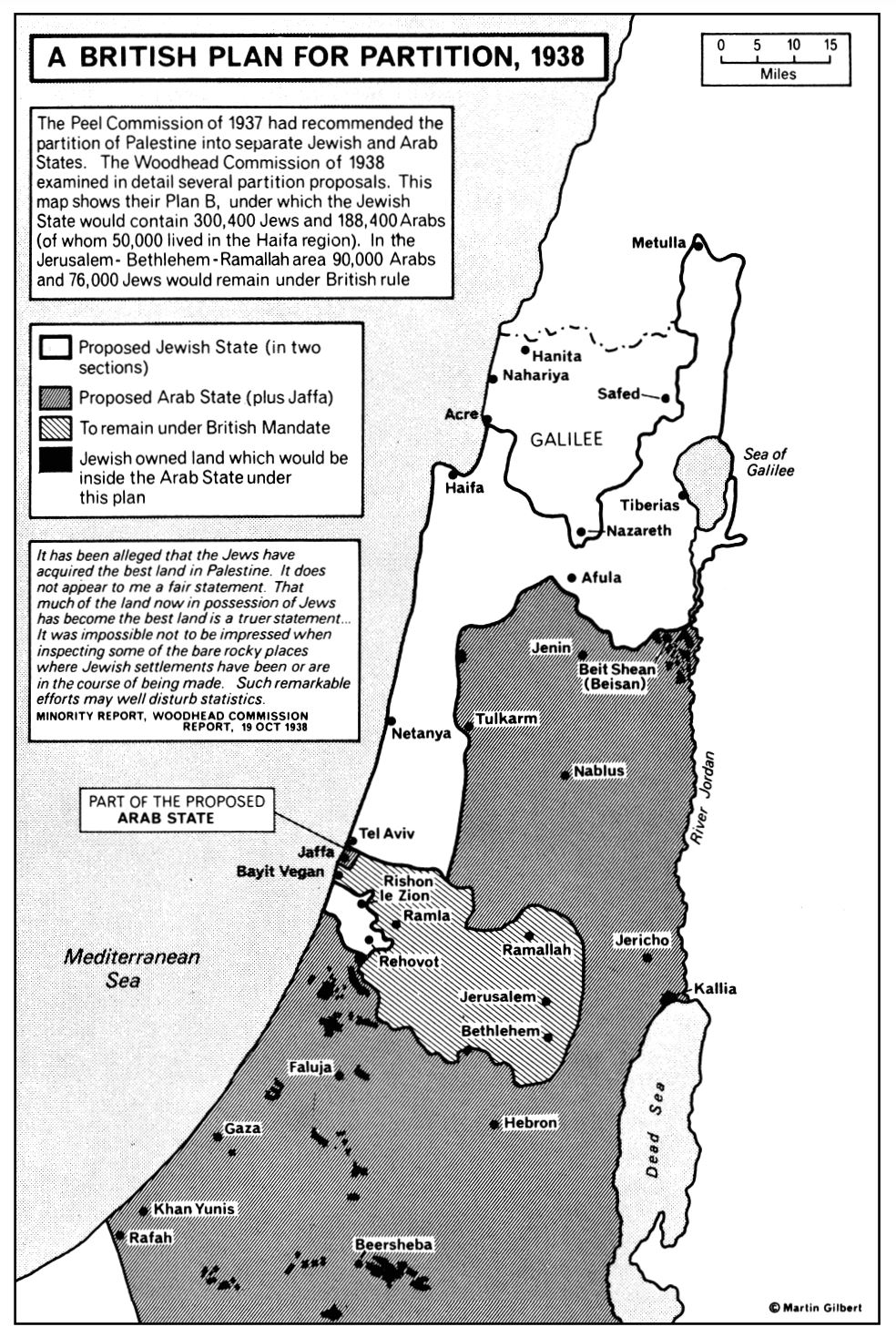
This maps depicts the originally anticipated borders of Israel upon inception 1938

== China's attempt to erase mapping of Israel ==
In October 2023, internet users noticed "the name Israel no longer appears on leading local digital maps services such as Baidu or Alibaba". Sources report that major cities are still defined as well as the borders that define present-day Israel and Palestinian territories, but not the name itself. WION (World Is One News) reported that it is because 'Chinese internet is getting inundated with antisemitism following the Israel-Hamas war'.

== See also ==
- Cartography of Jerusalem
- Cartography of Palestine
- Survey of Israel
- Geography of Israel
