= Survey of Palestine =

Mapping agency of Palestine during mandatory period

Survey of Israel 1942–1958 1–100,000 Topographical maps. Click on each blue link to see the individual original maps in high resolution. The italicized links represent post-1948 maps, printed by the successor organization.

The Survey of Palestine was the government department responsible for the survey and mapping of Palestine during the British mandate period.

The survey department was established in 1920 in Jaffa, and moved to the outskirts of Tel Aviv in 1931. It established the Palestine grid. In early 1948, the British Mandate appointed a temporary Director General of the Survey Department for the forthcoming Jewish State. This department became the Survey of Israel.

The maps produced by the survey have been widely used in "Palestinian refugee cartography" by scholars documenting the 1948 Palestinian expulsion and flight; notably in Salman Abu Sitta's Atlas of Palestine and Walid Khalidi's All That Remains. In 2019 the maps were used as the basis for Palestine Open Maps, supported by the Bassel Khartabil Free Culture Fellowship.

== History ==
Map showing the amount of surveyed land by 1947; the area corresponds closely to the land allotted to the proposed "Jewish State" in the United Nations Partition Plan for Palestine.

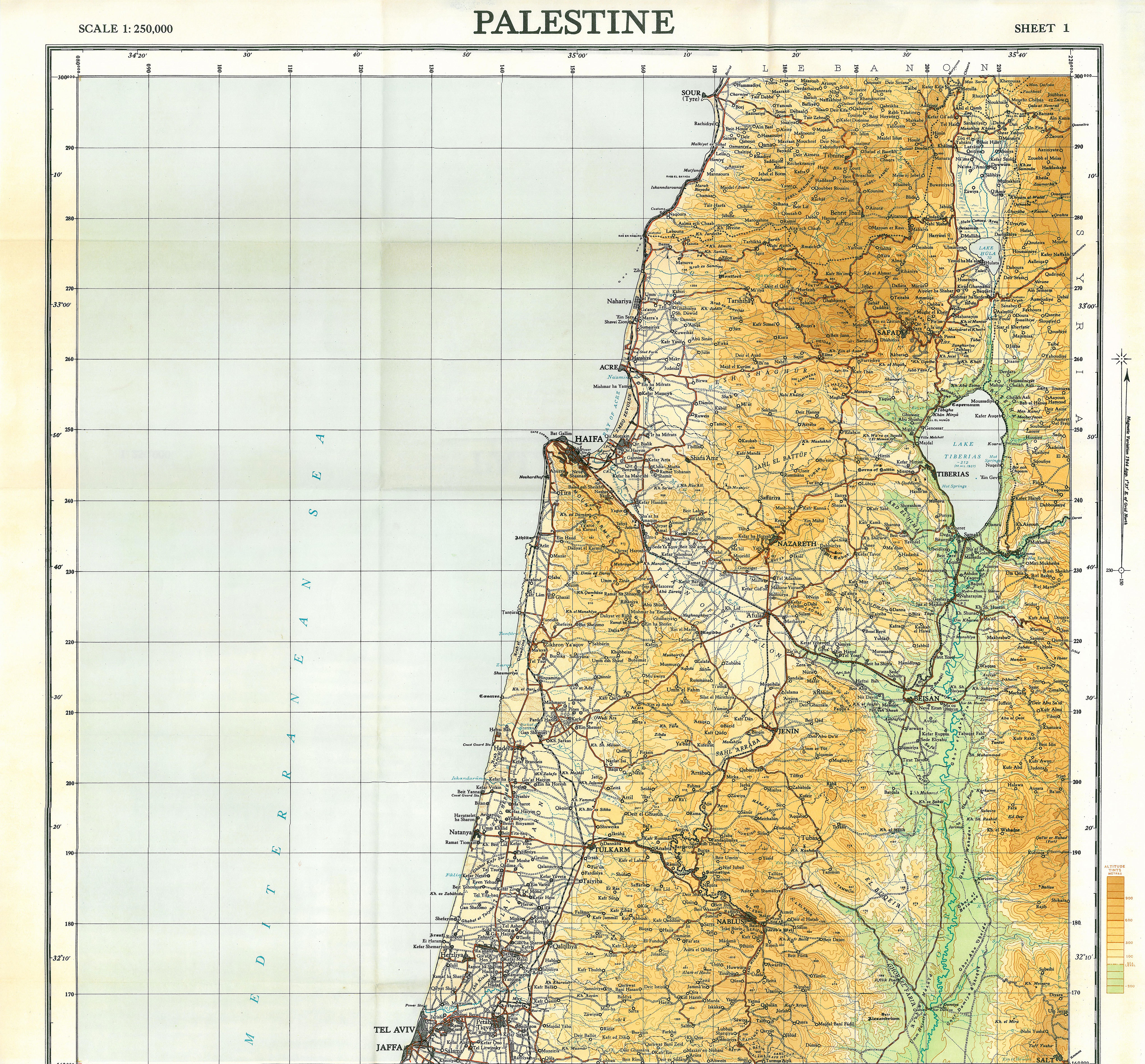
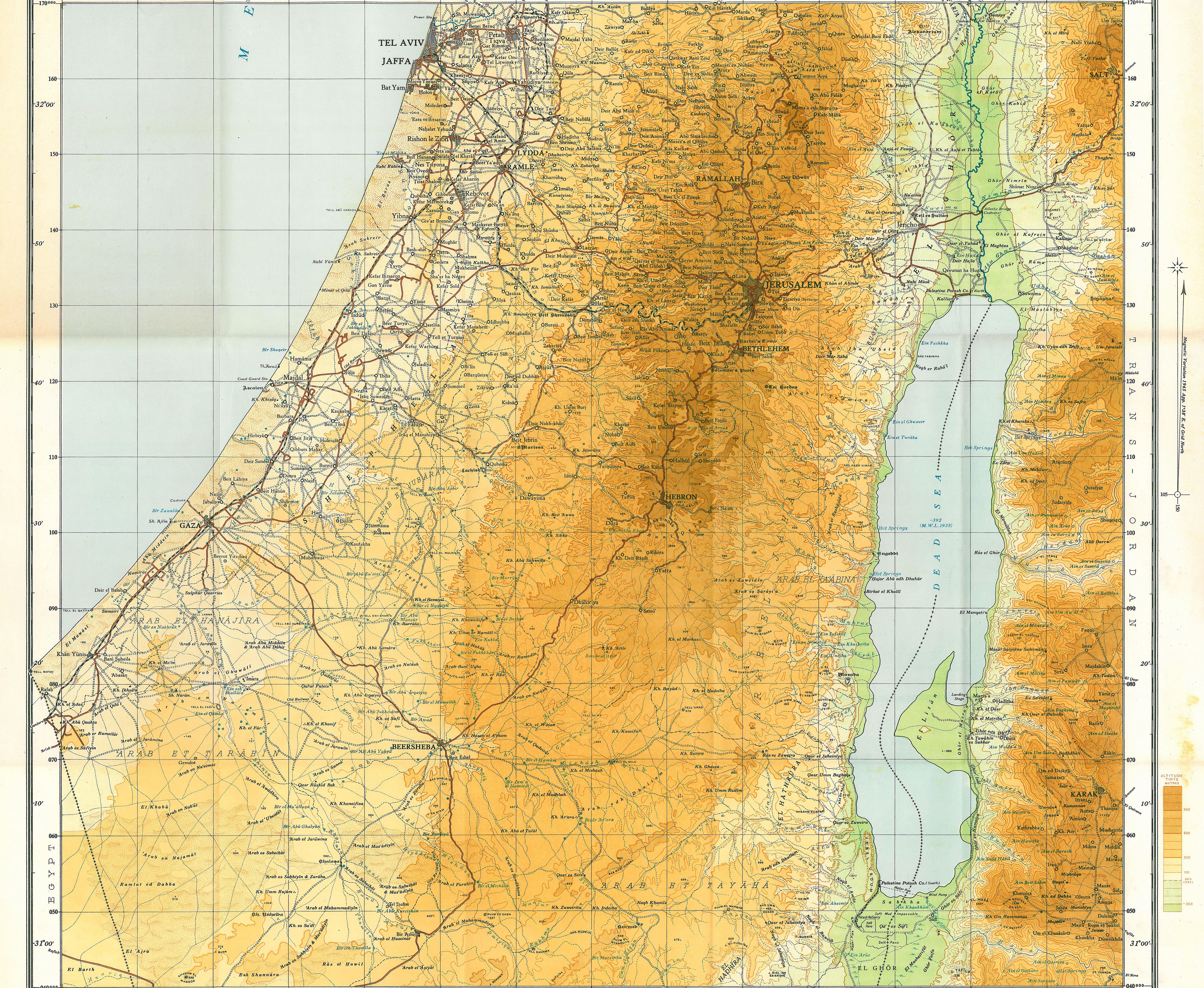
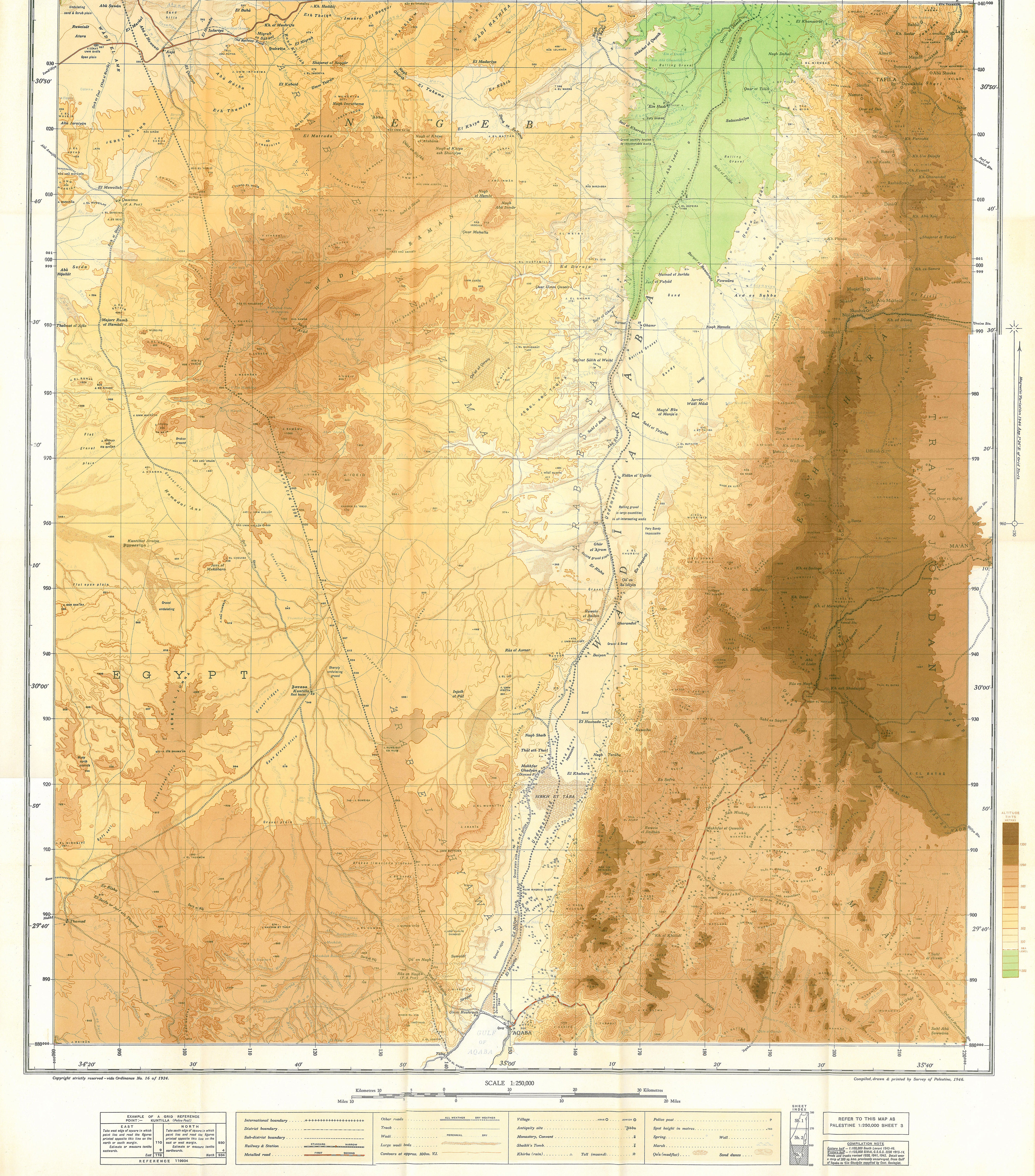
1944 maps (1:250,000) from the Survey Department of Palestine

Prior to the beginning of the Mandate for Palestine, the British had carried out two significant surveys of the region: the PEF Survey of Palestine between 1872 and 1880, and a series of small-scale maps developed by General Allenby's Royal Engineers for the 1915–18 Sinai and Palestine campaign. The Geographical Section of the War Office (G.S.G.S.), together with the Survey of Egypt, produced regional maps extending to Syria and Transjordan (scales 1:125,000, 1:250,000), copies of the PEF maps overprinted with revisions, and local maps, usually in the scale of 1:40,000.

Immediately following the start of the Occupied Enemy Territory Administration, the Zionist Organization began to pressure the British authorities to immediately begin the cadastral survey of the land, to facilitate Jewish land purchase in Palestine. The Zionist Organization wanted to use the results of the survey work to identify land open for Jewish settlement and the strategies needed to acquire it, whether it was privately owned, state land or other types of land. The Survey was initially resisted by the Palestinian Arab population, who considered it to be an attempt to sell their land from underneath them, given the differences between Ottoman land laws, customary land law and the new system which required "absolute proof of ownership".

The national triangulation framework had been completed by 1930, consisting of 105 major points and c.20,000 lower-order points. The 1:10,000 survey was completed in 1934, followed by the 1:2,500 property survey for Land Settlement; these surveys formed the basis for the published 1:20,000 and 1:100,000 topographical series.

In 1940 the department no longer had responsibility for adjudicating land settlement claims, and began to focus fully on the survey work. The February 1940 Land Transfer Regulations had divided Palestine into three regions with different restrictions on land sales applying to each. In Zone "A," which included the hill-country of Judea as a whole, certain areas in the Jaffa sub-District, and in the Gaza District, and the northern part of the Beersheba sub-District, new agreements for sale of land other than to a Palestinian Arab were forbidden without the High Commissioner's permission. In Zone "B," which included the Jezreel Valley, eastern Galilee, a parcel of coastal plain south of Haifa, a region northeast of the Gaza District, and the southern part of the Beersheba sub-District, sale of land by a Palestinian Arab was forbidden except to a Palestinian Arab with similar exceptions. In the "free zone," which consisted of Haifa Bay, the coastal plain from Zikhron Ya'akov to Yibna, and the neighborhood of Jerusalem, there were no restrictions. The reason given for the regulations was that the Mandatory was required to "ensur[e] that the rights and positions of other sections of the population are not prejudiced," and an assertion that "such transfers of land must be restricted if Arab cultivators are to maintain their existing standard of life and a considerable landless Arab population is not soon to be created"

By the 1947–1949 Palestine war, the Survey of Palestine had finalized topographical maps for all of the country except the southern Negev, although it had confirmed land title in less than 20% of the country, specifically in the areas of Jewish settlement. A cadastral survey was not carried out in the areas which would become the West Bank until after 1948; a situation which caused significant challenges in subsequent years.

The department grew significantly throughout the mandate period: it began with 46 professionals in 1921, of which 25 were recruited from outside Palestine, and by 1942 had 215 professionals, with only 11 recruited from outside Palestine. The Survey of Palestine printed 1,800 maps and plans in 1926, 19,000 in 1929, 64,000 in 1933 and 100,000 in 1939. There were two schools for training Palestinian and Arab surveyors, one in Jenin that operated for one year starting 1942, and the other in Nazareth that opened in 1944.

In early 1948, temporary Directors General of the Survey Department were appointed for each of the proposed "Jewish State" and "Arab State" under the terms of the United Nations Partition Plan for Palestine, and the pre-existing files and maps were to be shared. However, during the 1948 Arab–Israeli War, British lorries delivering the "Arab state" portion of their maps were diverted back to Tel Aviv. Today, the historical maps are held at the Survey of Israel, the Hebrew University of Jerusalem, the Ministry of Agriculture and Rural Development and Israeli Ministry of Defense archives.

== Land disputes ==
In 1937, then Commissioner of Lands and Surveys, Lieutenant Colonel F. J. Salmon, described the importance of the department's work with respect to allowing land purchases:

In the Ottoman days, a title to a piece of land in Palestine was a very vague document. There was no survey, recording shape, area or position; the description was usually, to say the least of it, ambiguous, and the extent which was the gauge for taxation, was almost invariably falsified to save the pocket of the owner. Big blocks were, and in areas where there has been no land settlement, still are, shared by large numbers of owners who have no defined boundaries and who often alter the position of their plots from year to year… To purchase land from a title owner, or worse still, from an occupier who had no title, was a very uncertain business, and often still is. The difficulty, however, is now being solved, though very slowly, by Land Settlement… The claims are recorded and examined by Palestinian Assistant Settlement Officers, while cases of dispute are heard by British Land Settlement Officers… Even in areas that are not under Settlement, a land-owner can apply for an authoritative registration of title on a modern survey, but if there is a dispute, this has to be settled by the Land Court, a much slower, more expensive and laborious proceeding than an investigation and judgment by a Settlement Officer.

== Notable publications ==
- 1:100,000 topographical maps (see here, and a gazetteer here): By 1938 the 1:100,000 topographical maps had been completed as far south as Beersheba.
- 1:250,000 administrative maps (see here): the 1:250,000 administrative map, in three sheets, followed the 1:100,000 map
- "Palestine Index to Villages & Settlements" (see here), an administrative map without relief, usually on a single-sheet 1:250,000 scale, was often used as a base for overprinted thematic maps.
- 1:500,000 motor map (see here): the 1:500,000 motor map followed the 1:100,000 map.
- 1:20,000 topographical-cadastral maps (see here): 45 1:20,000 sheets had been published by 1940, primarily covering the coastal area. By 1948, c.150 1:20,000 sheets had been published, covering the whole country north of Beersheba.
- Jerusalem 1:10,000 and 1:2,500 maps (see here): In 1936 a 1:2,500 map of the Old City of Jerusalem was published, the first detailed map since the 1865 Ordnance Survey of Jerusalem. This was followed by 1:5,000 provisional plans of Jerusalem and its environs, which were reduced to 1:10,000 scale for general printing.
- Historic maps (see here): The department also produced "historical" maps: "Map of Roman Palestine" (1936), "Palestine of the Crusades" (1937) and "Palestine of the Old Testament" (1939).
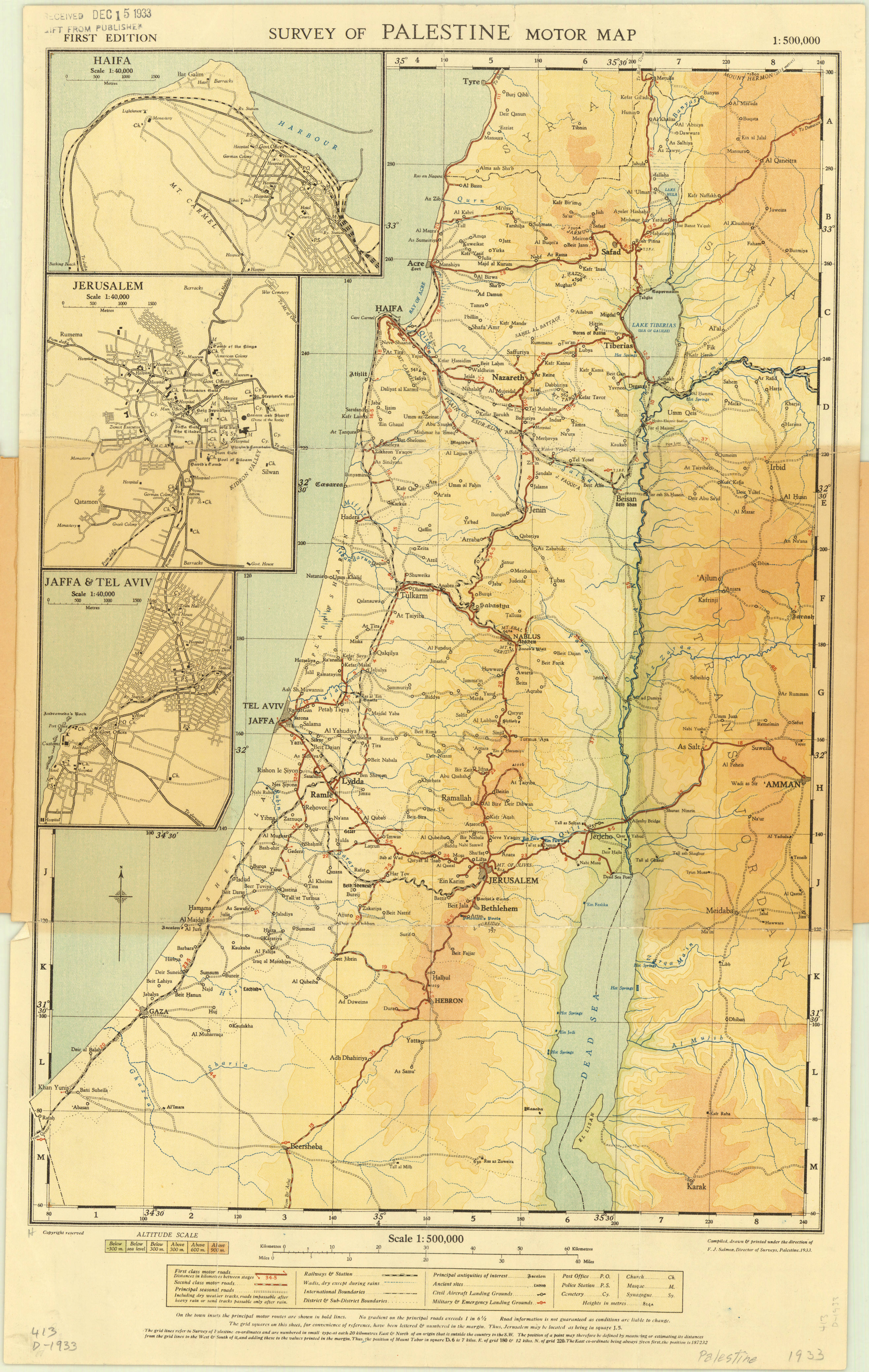
1933 Motor map of Palestine, 1:500,000

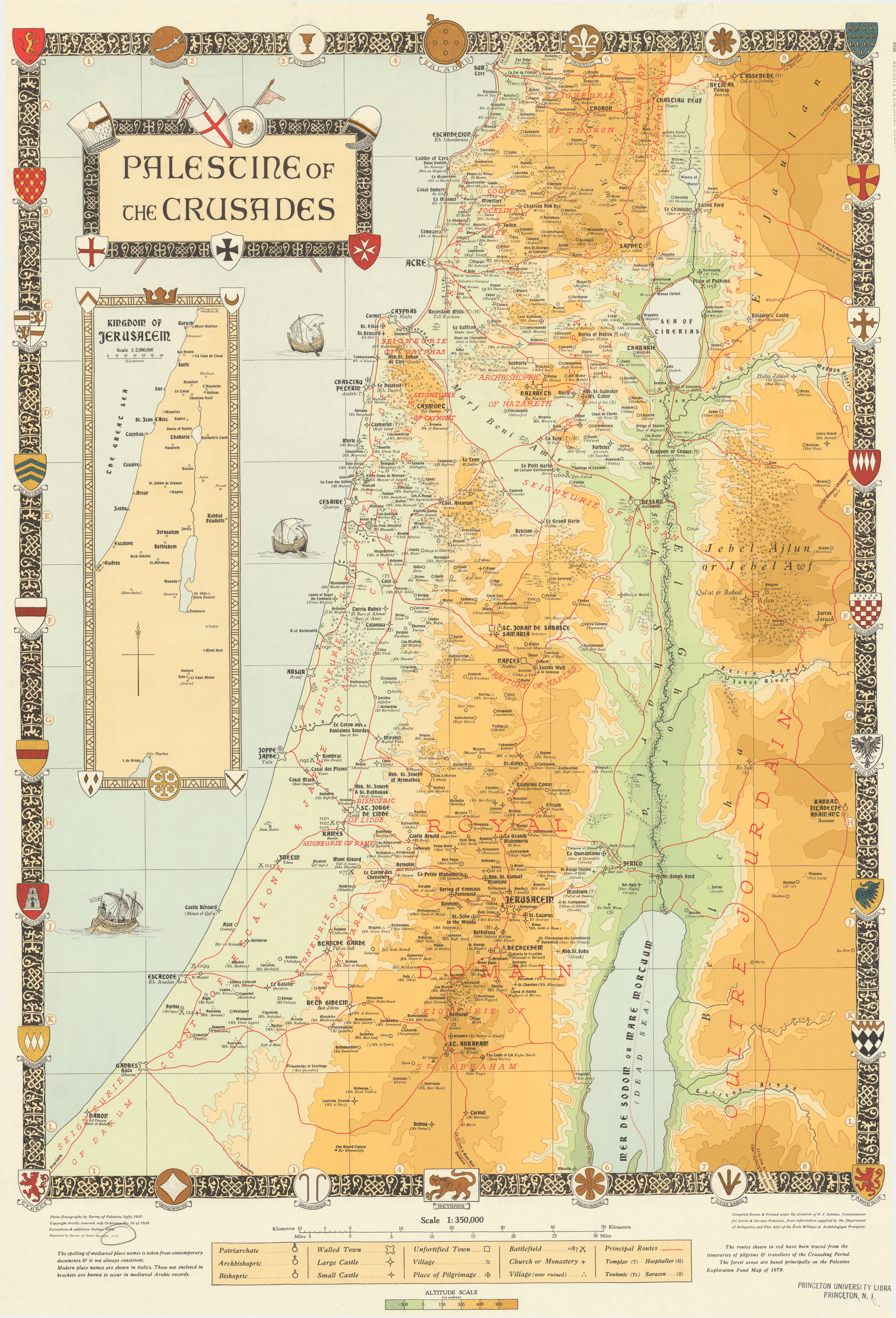
Palestine of the Crusades, 1:350,000

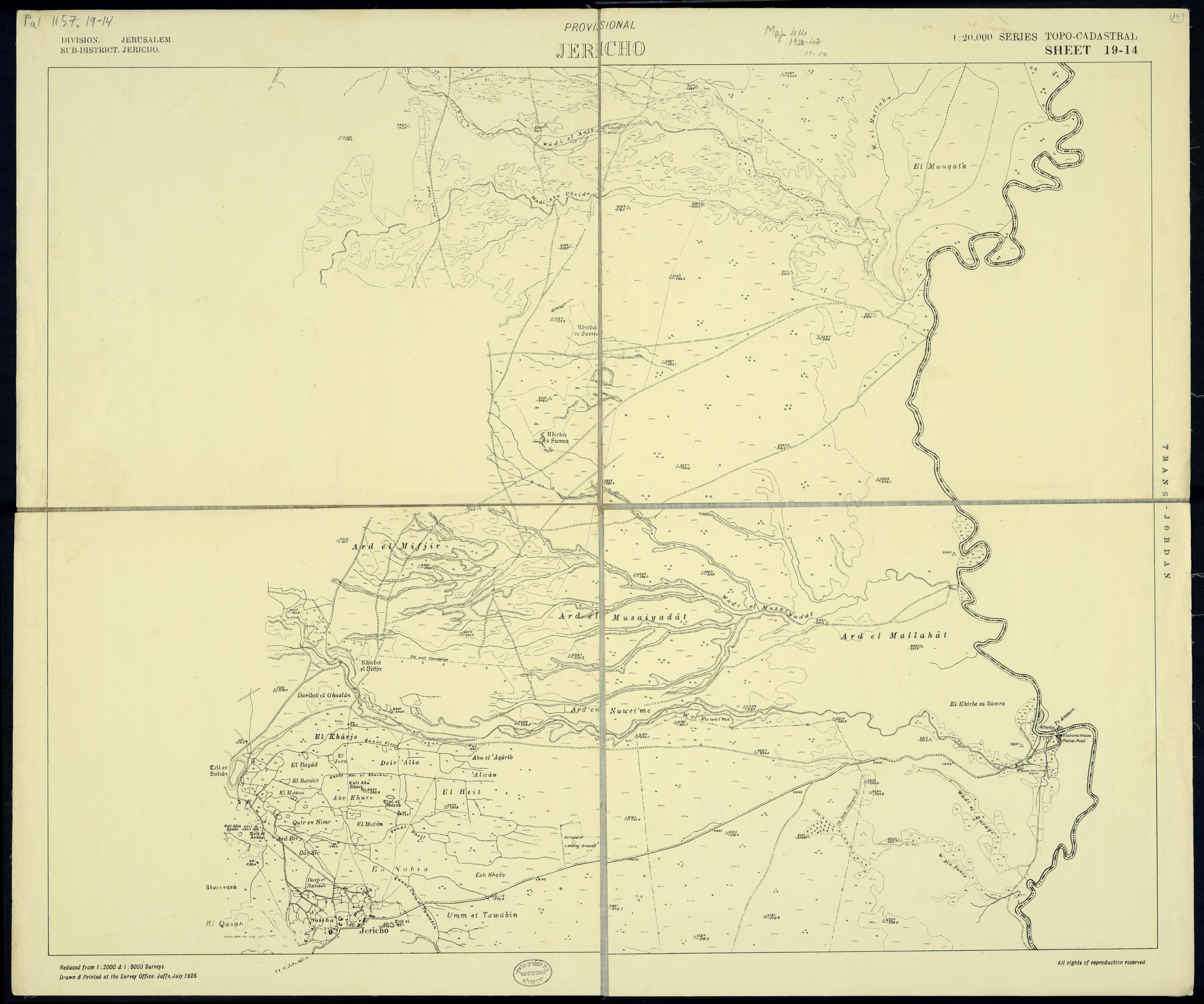
1928 map of Jericho region, 1:20,000

1929 map of Haifa, 1:10,000

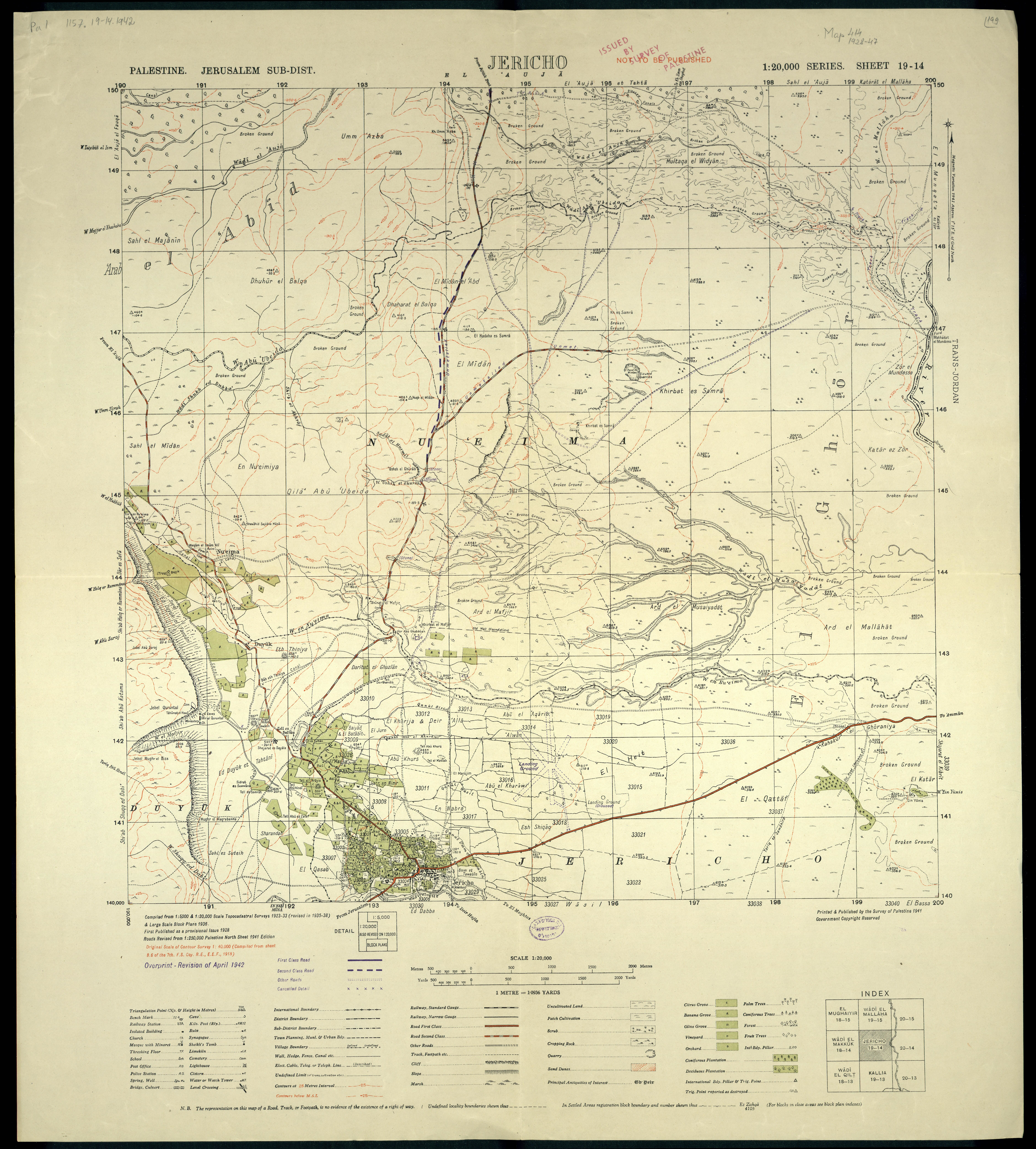
1942 map of Jericho region, 1:20,000

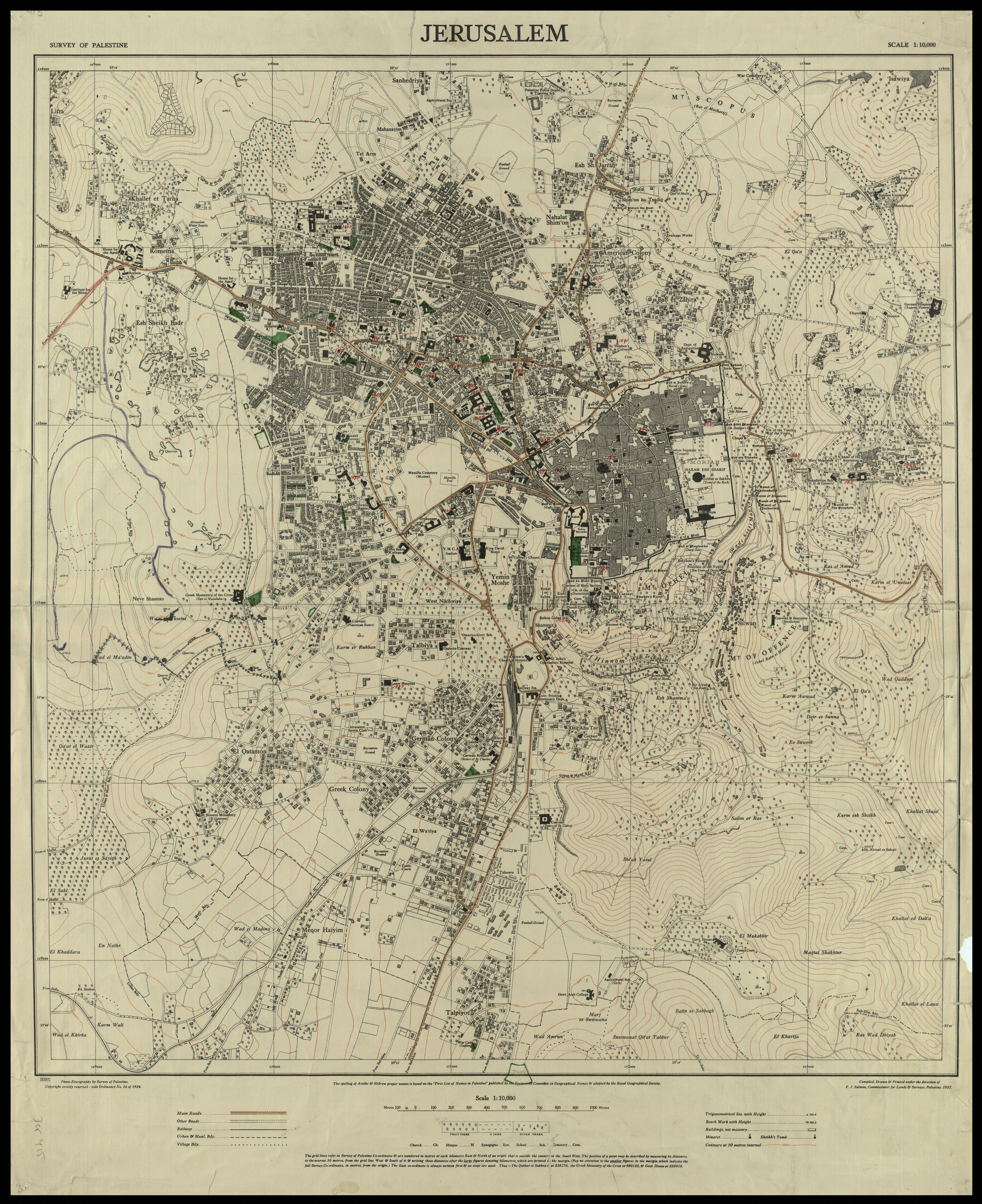
1937 map of Jerusalem, 1:10,000

Map showing all village boundaries

== Notable survey laws (ordinances) ==
The Mandate government laws regulated and empowered surveying, surveyors, and survey fees.

- Cadastral Survey Ordinance 1920, published in the Official Gazette in July 1920. Initially limited to the districts of Gaza and Beersheba, extended to the whole country in February 1921 Land Surveyors Ordinance 1925
- Land Surveyors Ordinance 1925, published on 1 May 1925, required registration of landed property to be based on an approved plan, and standardized the requirements for all such survey maps
- Land Settlement Ordinance 1928, established the use of the Torrens system of cadastral (ownership) registration
- Survey Ordinance, Surveyors Regulations 1930, required certain metric scales such as an "even multiple of 1:10,000" and for individual properties "a scale of 1:2,500, 1:625, or larger".
- Survey Ordinance, Surveyors Regulations 1938, update of prior regulations, not annulled and replaced until Israel's Surveyors Regulations 1965 on 5 August 1965.

== Directors ==
- June – Dec.1920: Major Cecil Verdon Quinlan
- 1920–1931/2: Major Cuthbert Hilliard Ley
- 1931–1933: Robert Barker Crusher (acting)
- 1933–1938: Lieutenant Colonel Frederick John Salmon "Commissioner of Lands and Surveys"
- 1938–1939: James Nelson Stubbs (acting)
- 1940–1948: Andrew Park Mitchell

== Headquarters ==
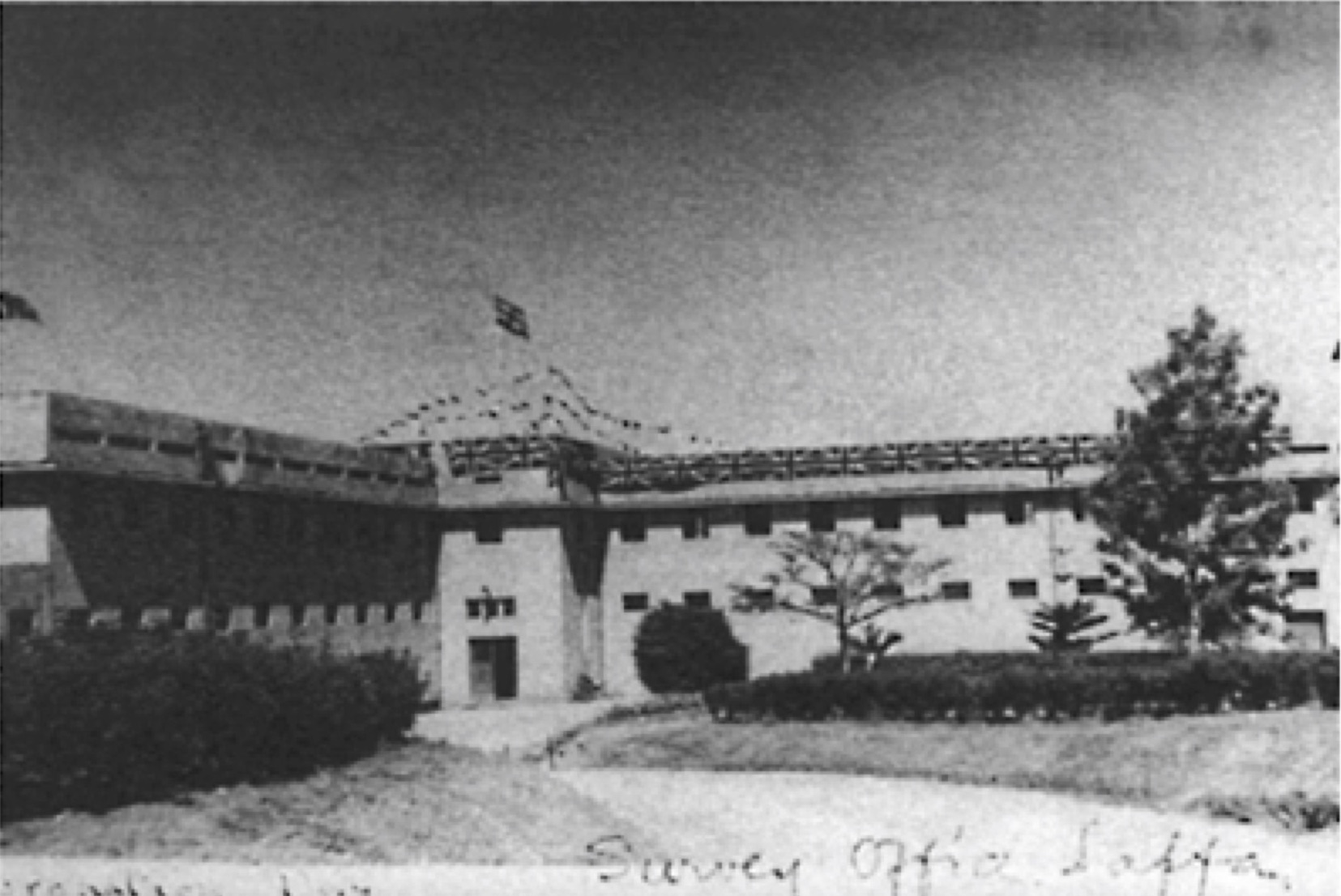
The headquarters of the Survey Department of Palestine in 1930

The first headquarters – in early 1920 – were based in Gaza City; they moved to Jaffa just a few months later. On 1 January 1931 a purpose-built building was opened to house the department at the southern end of a 30-acre (12 ha) plot near the German Templar colony on the outskirts of Tel Aviv (the location can be seen on this 1930 map). The location of the headquarters in the coastal plain favored for Zionist settlement, together with the fact that all other offices of the Mandate Government were in Jerusalem, have been said to emphasize "the strong link between the cadastral survey of Palestine and Zionist motives". Proposals to move the office to Jerusalem were raised in 1925, 1928 and 1935, but to no avail.

== 1945 maps of Jerusalem and environs ==
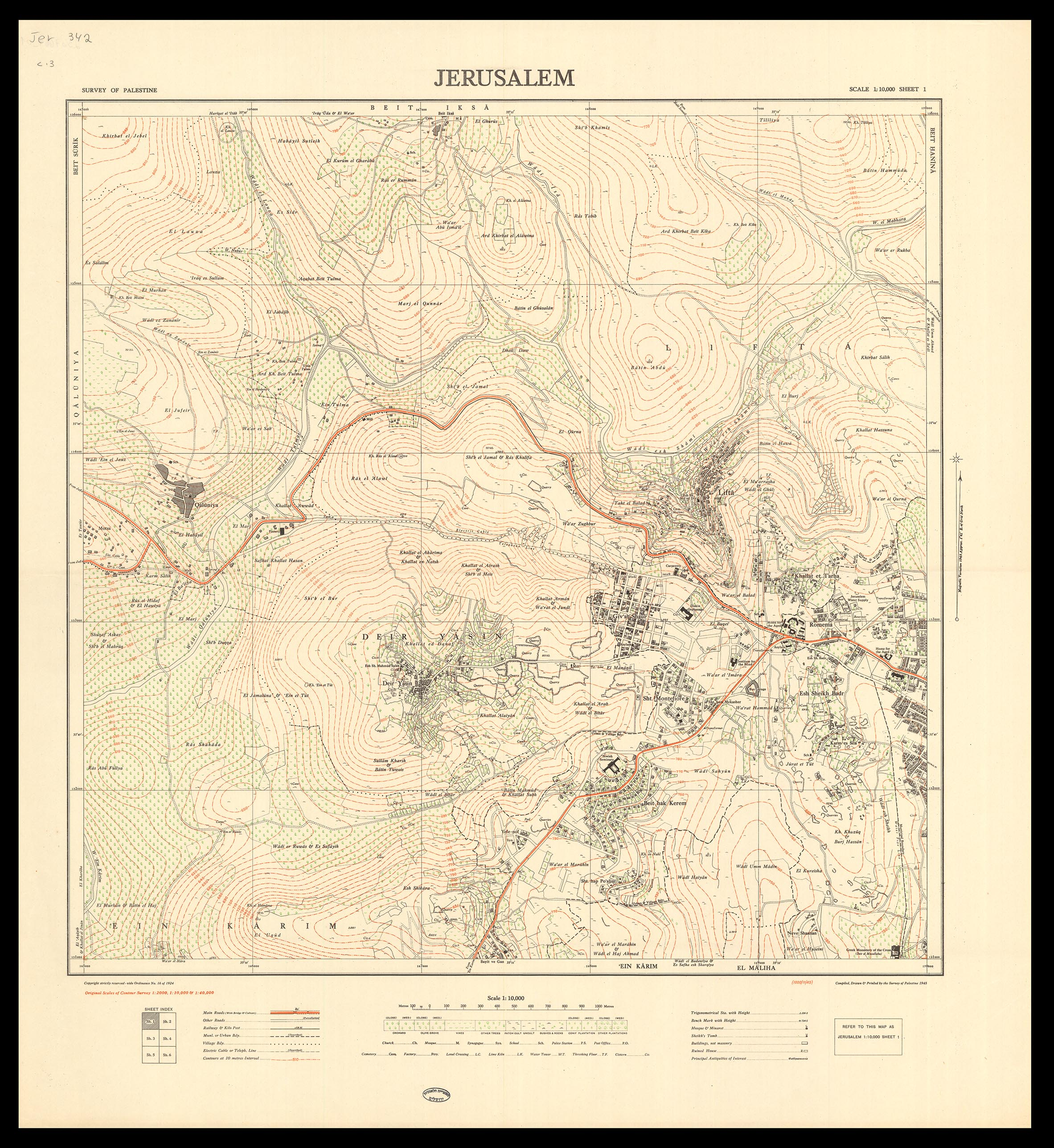
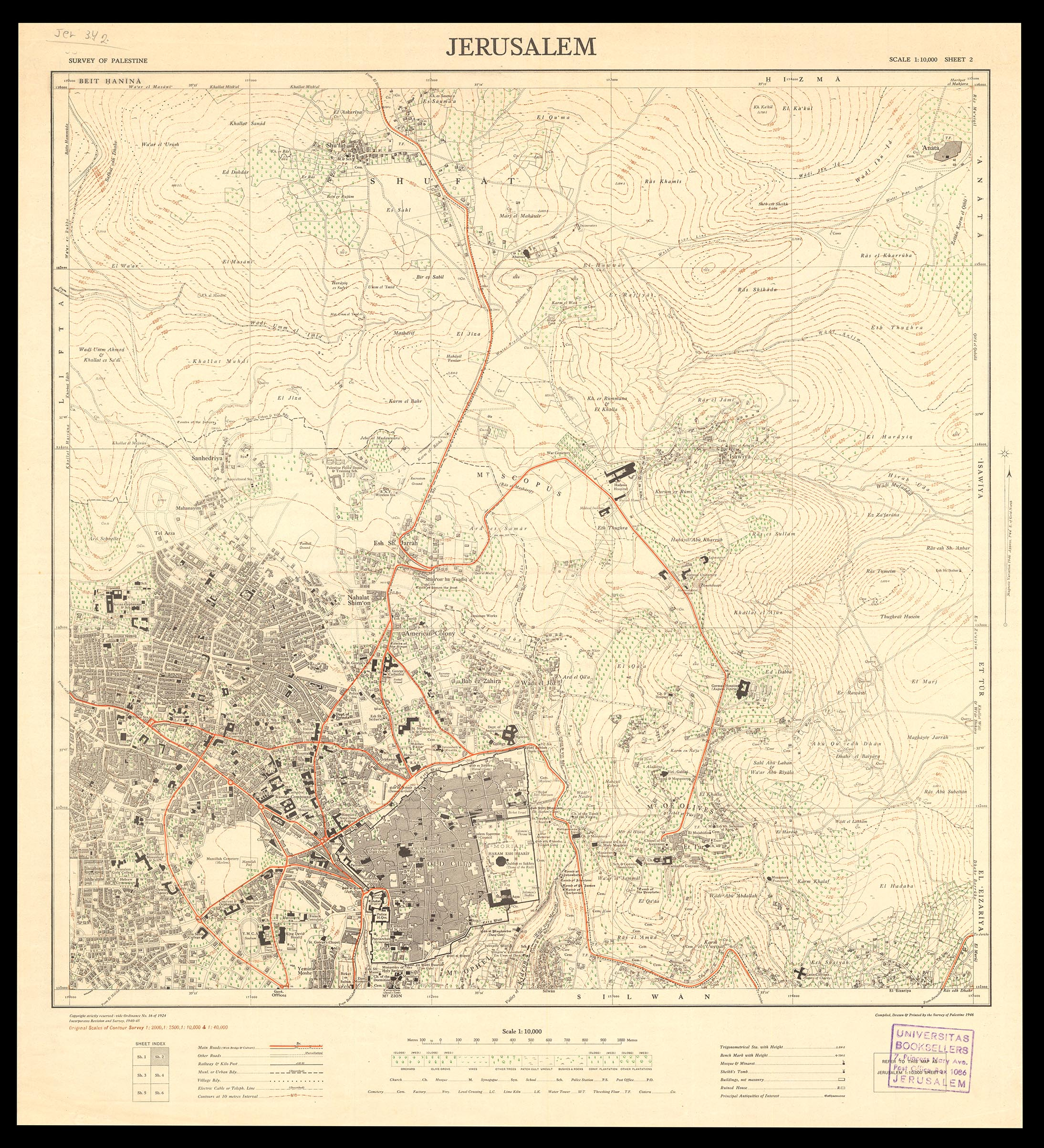
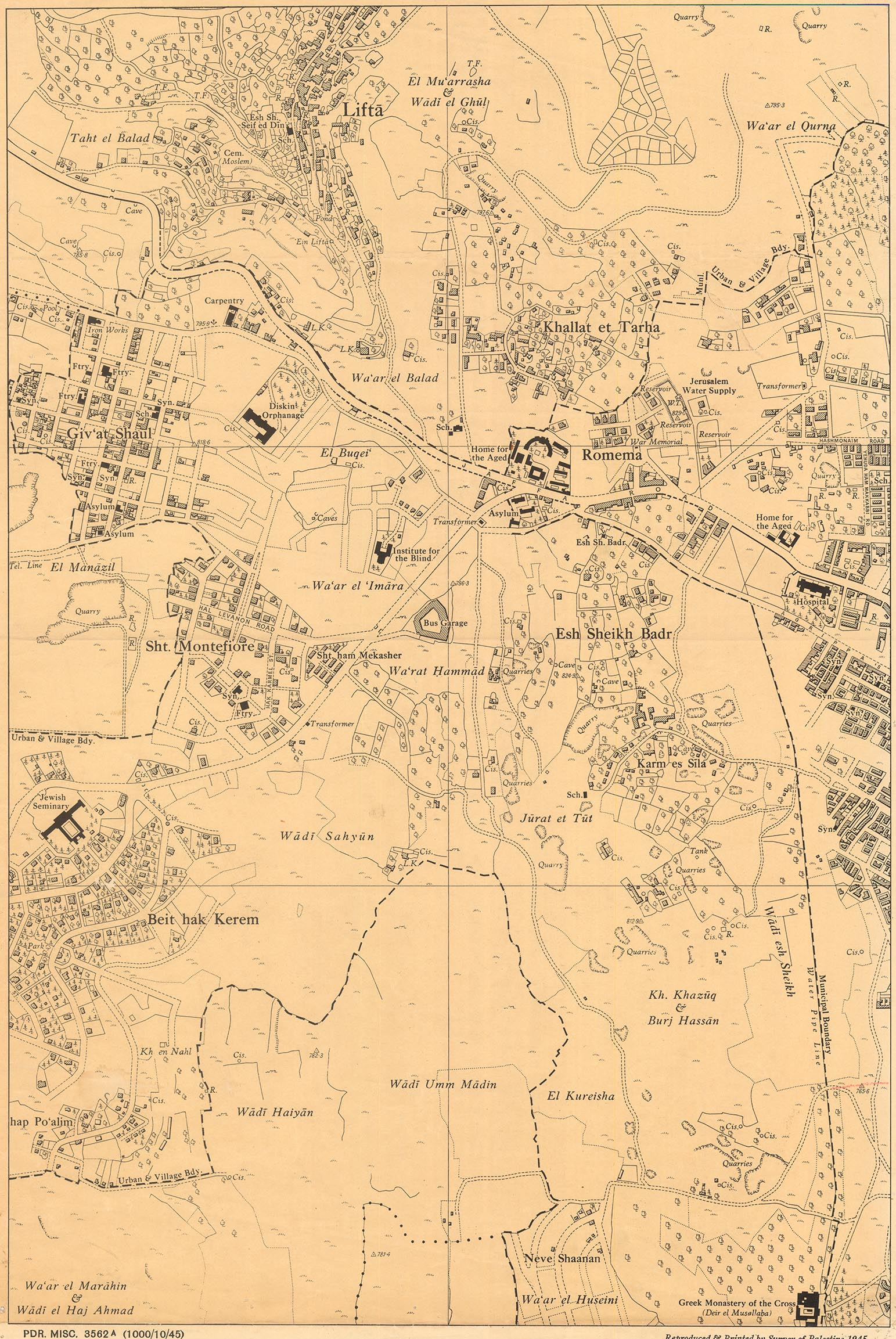
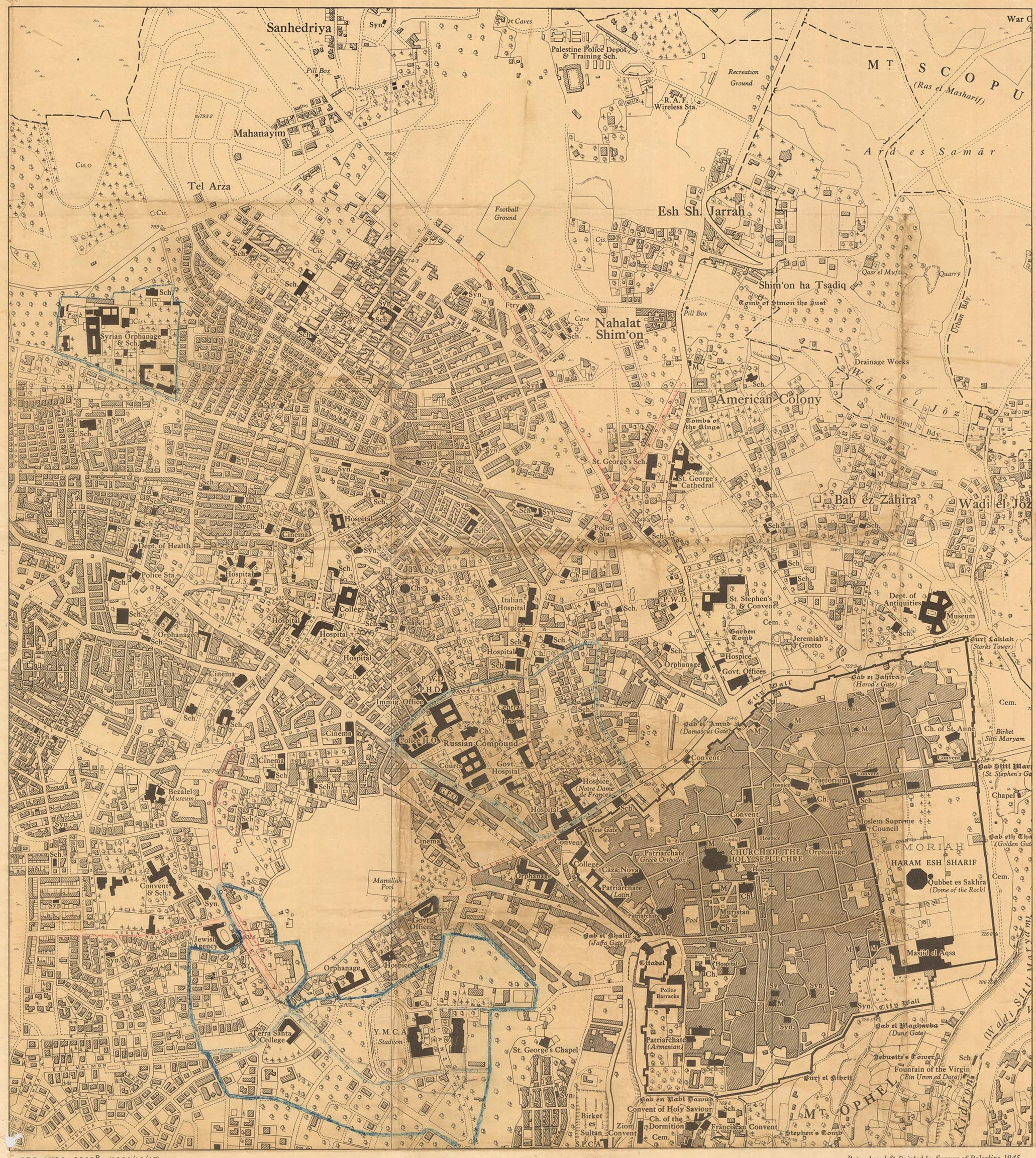
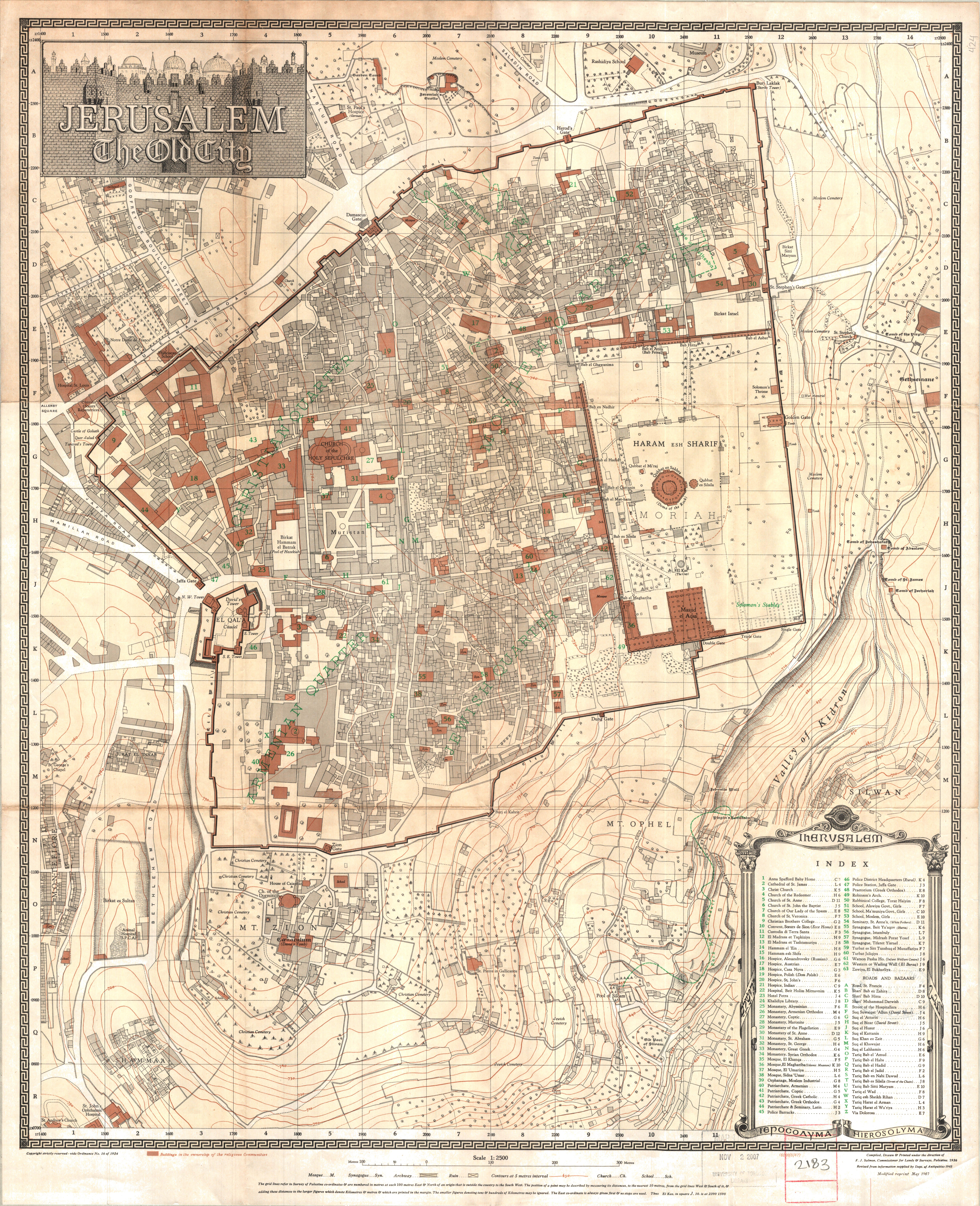
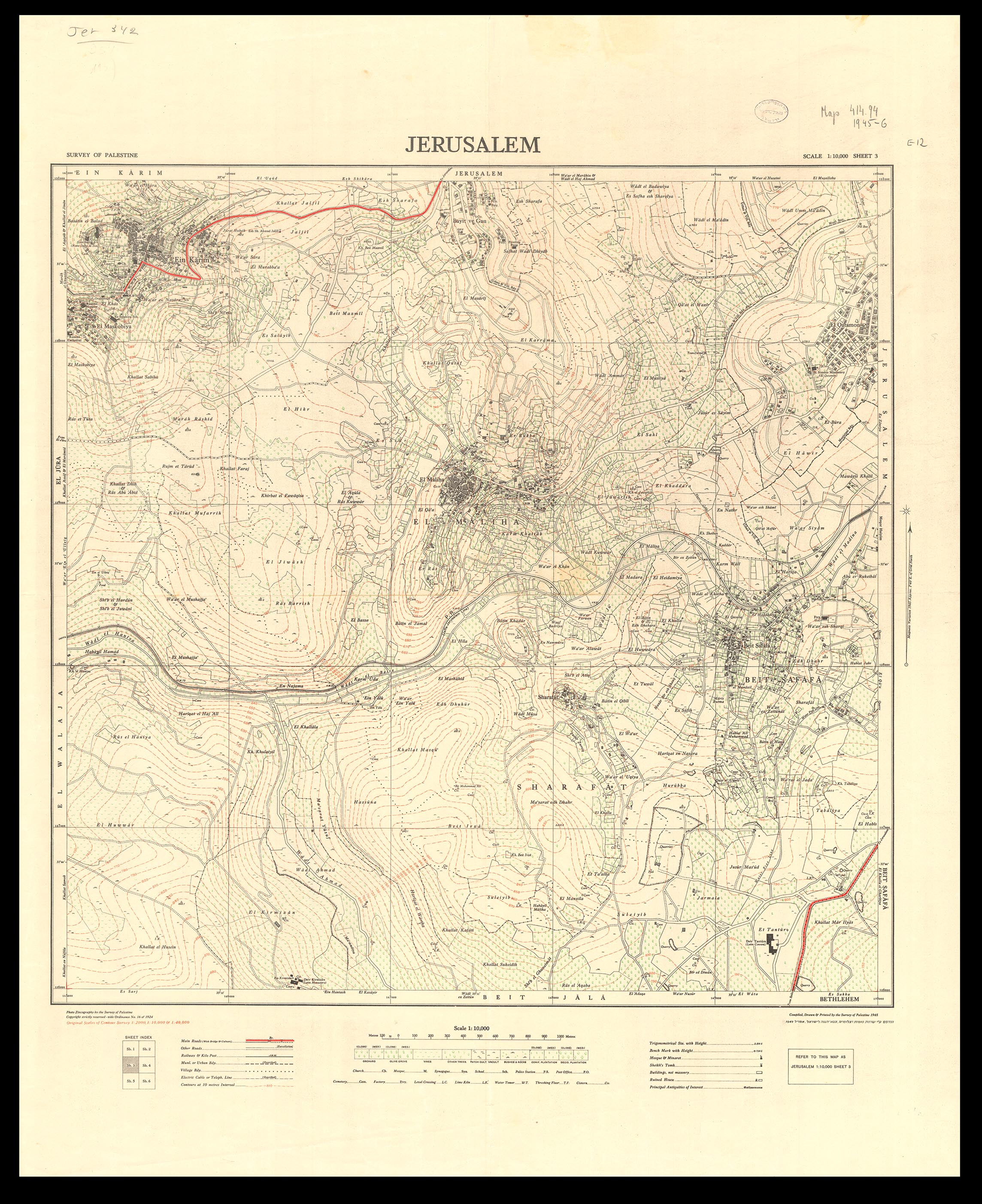
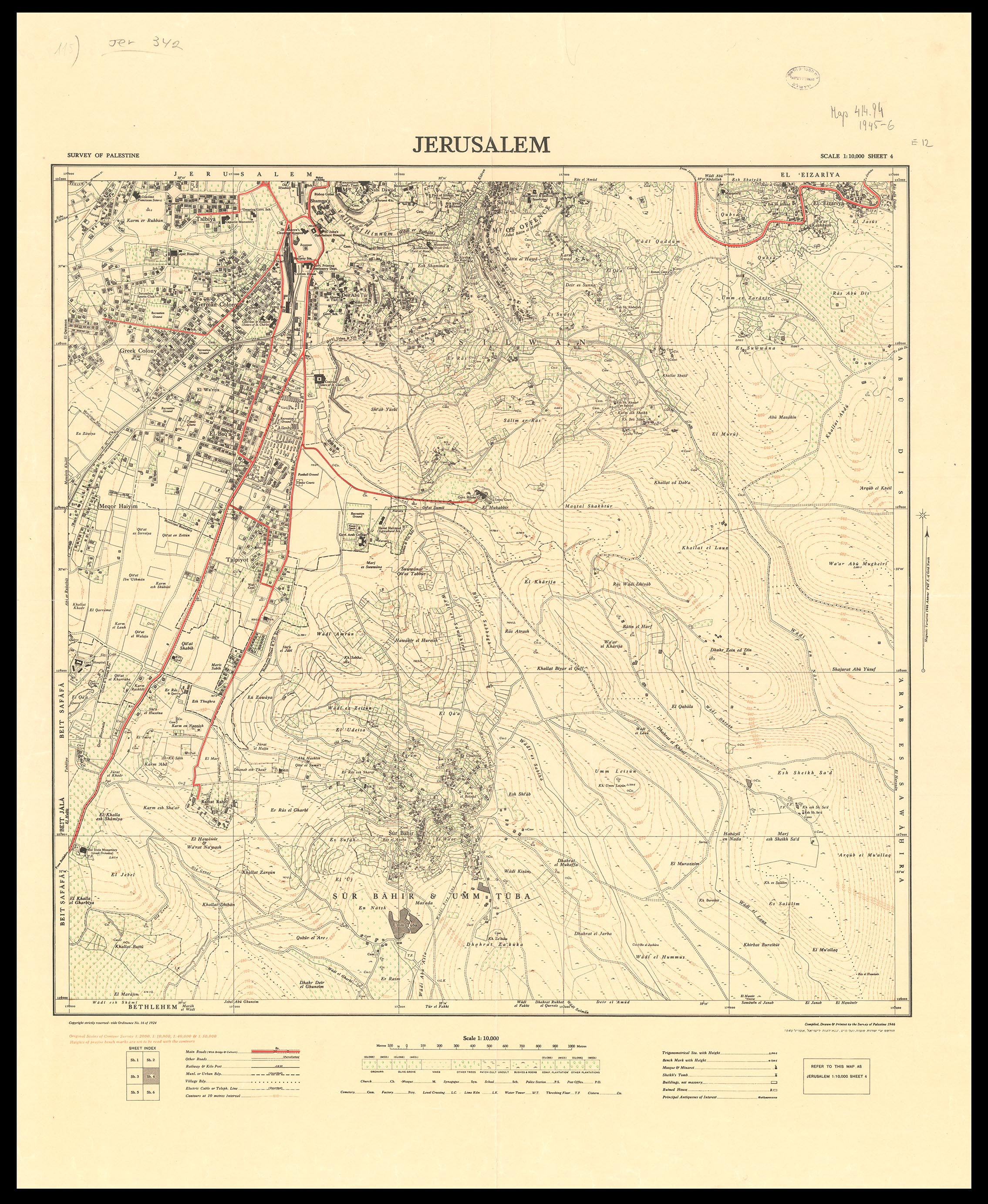
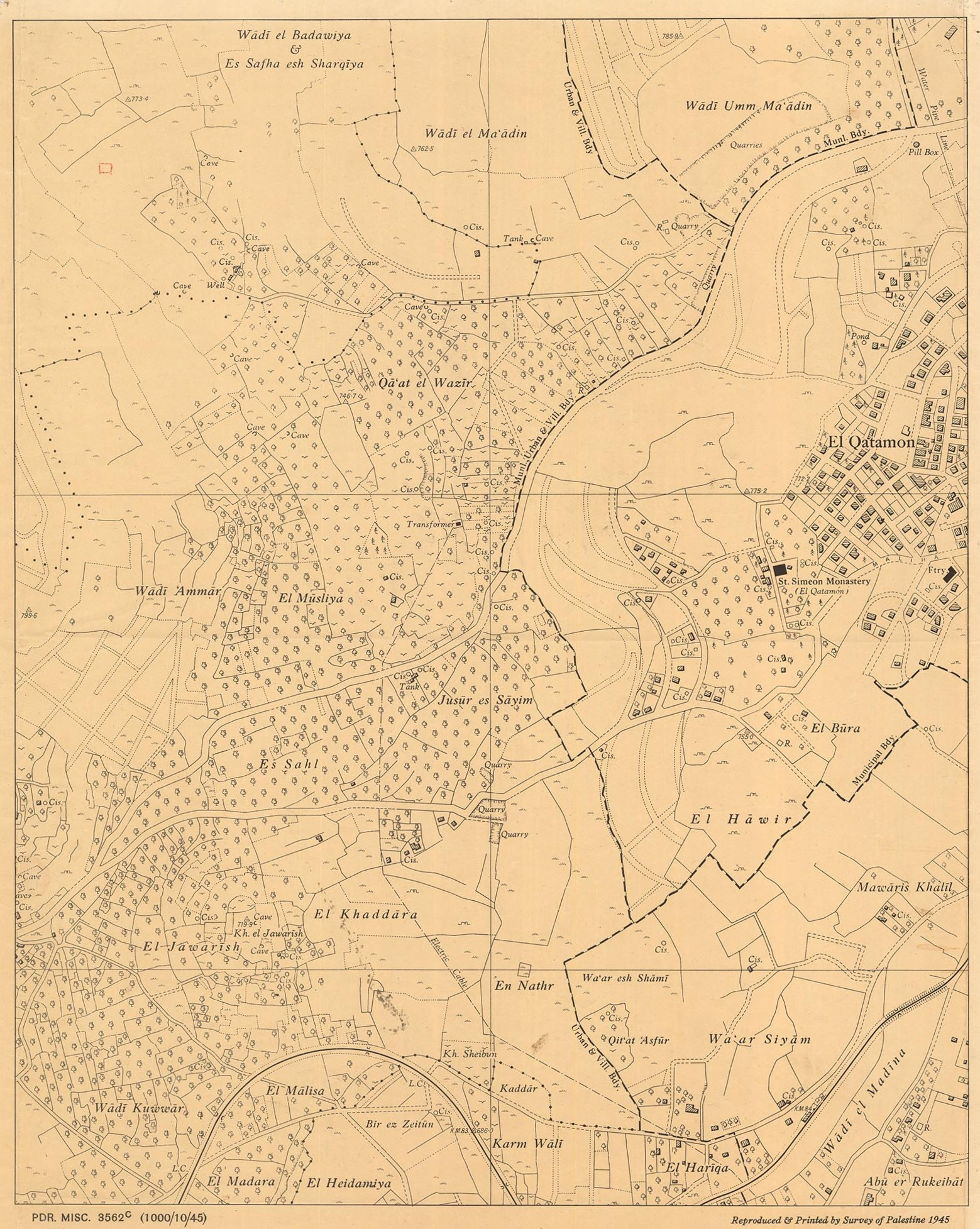
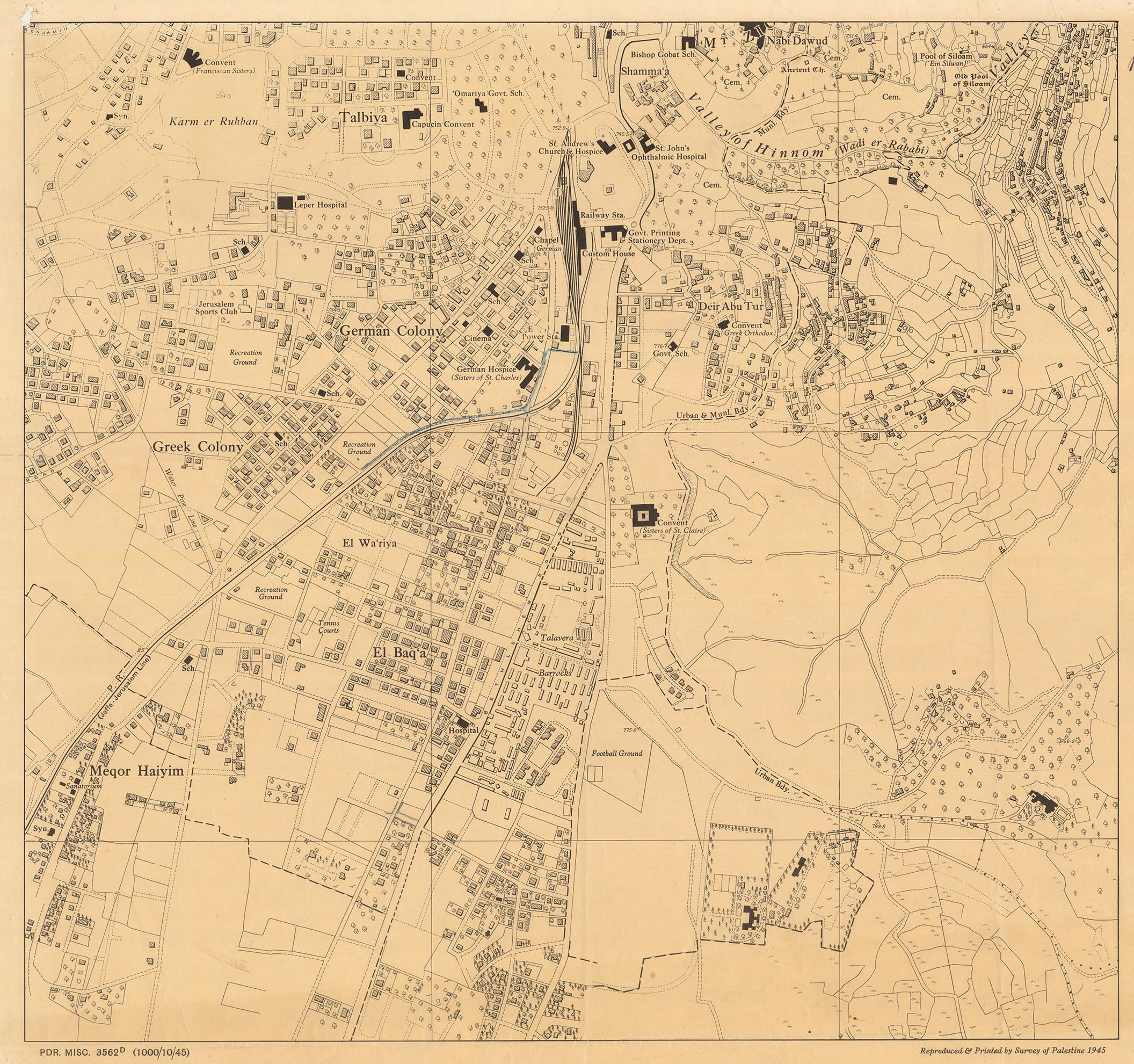
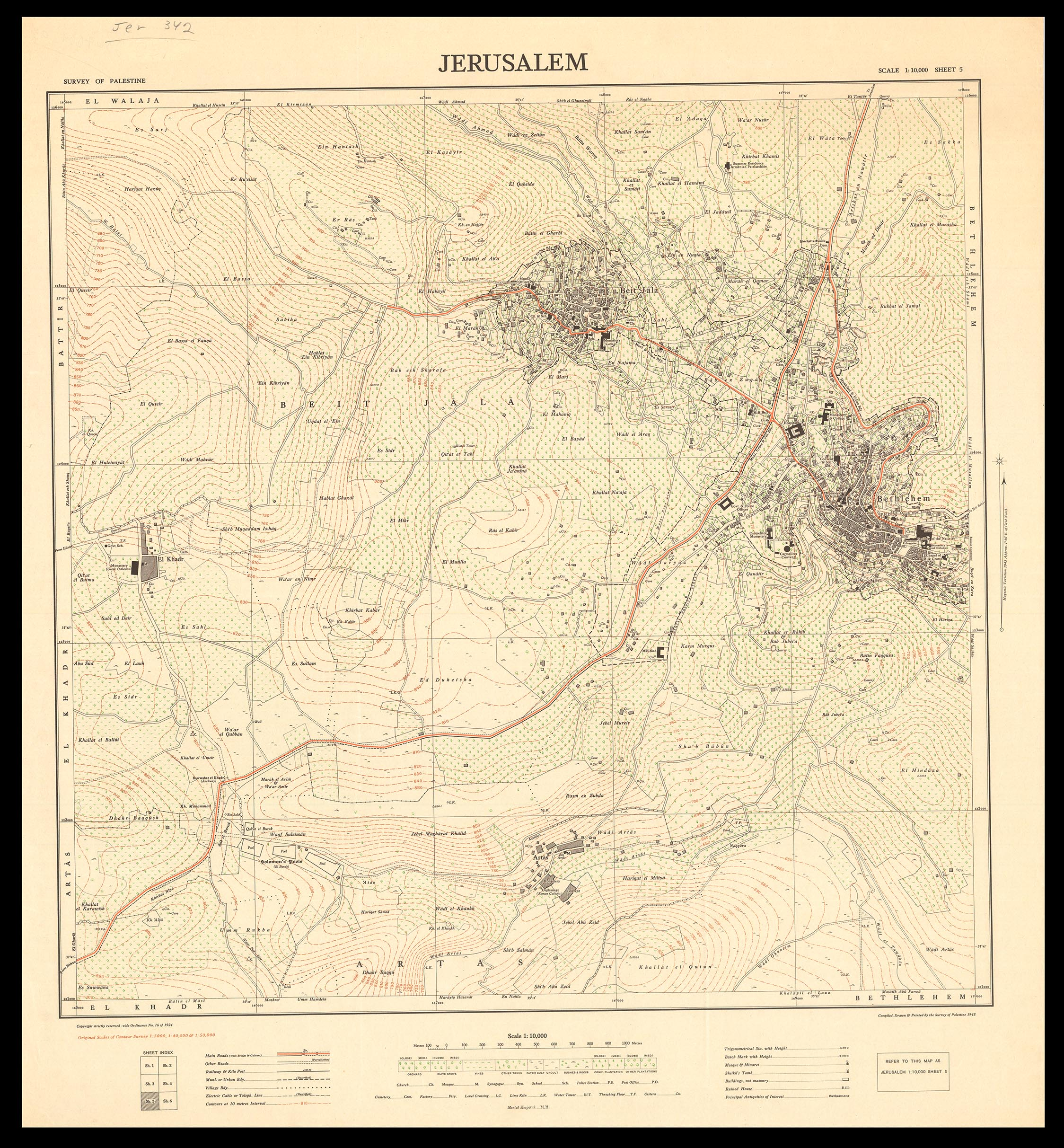
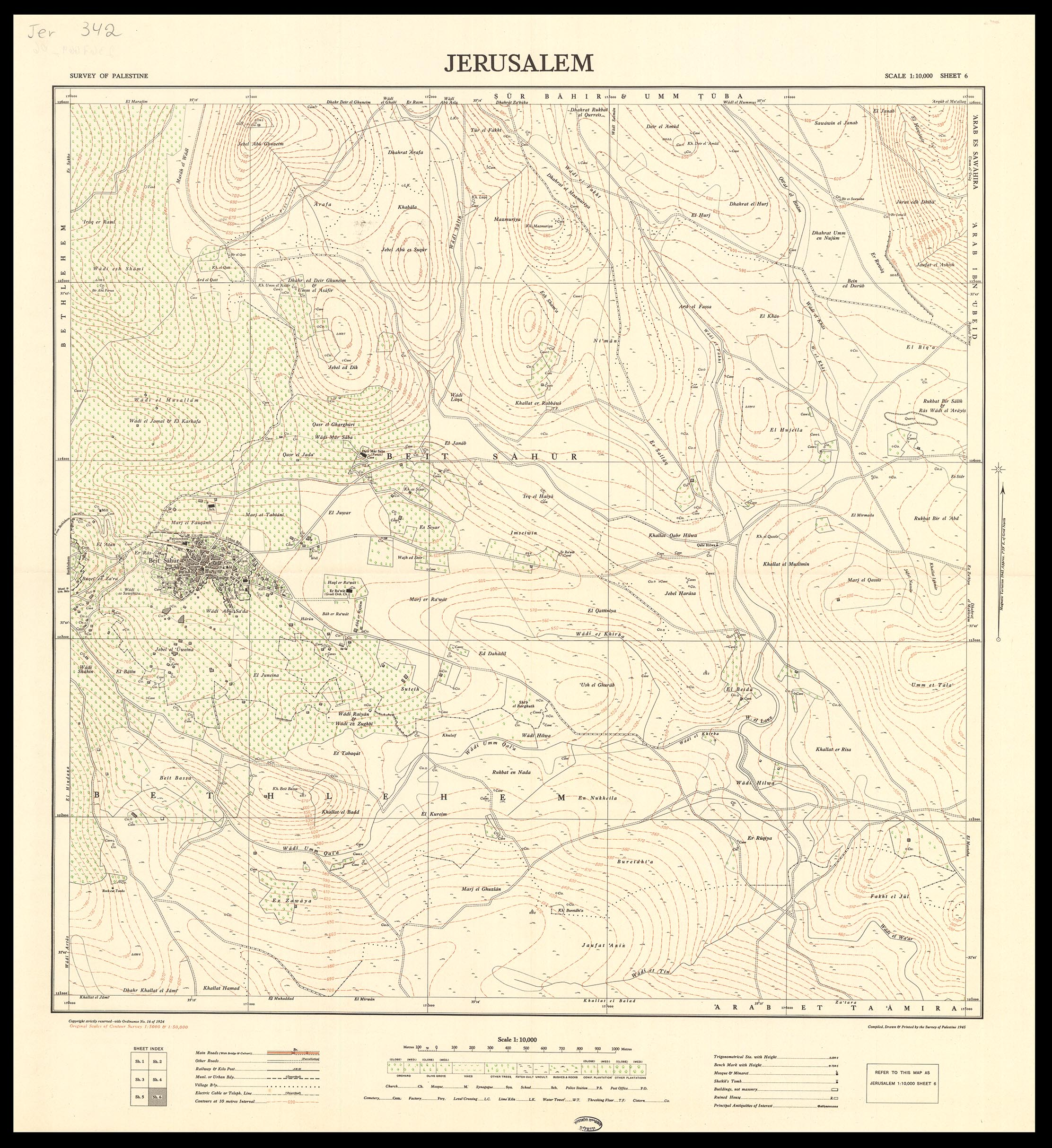
1:10,000			1:5,000			1:2,500
A	B		A	B
		1			1
		2			2
		3
Each sheet is a separate clickable image.

== 1:20,000 maps – Earliest available ==
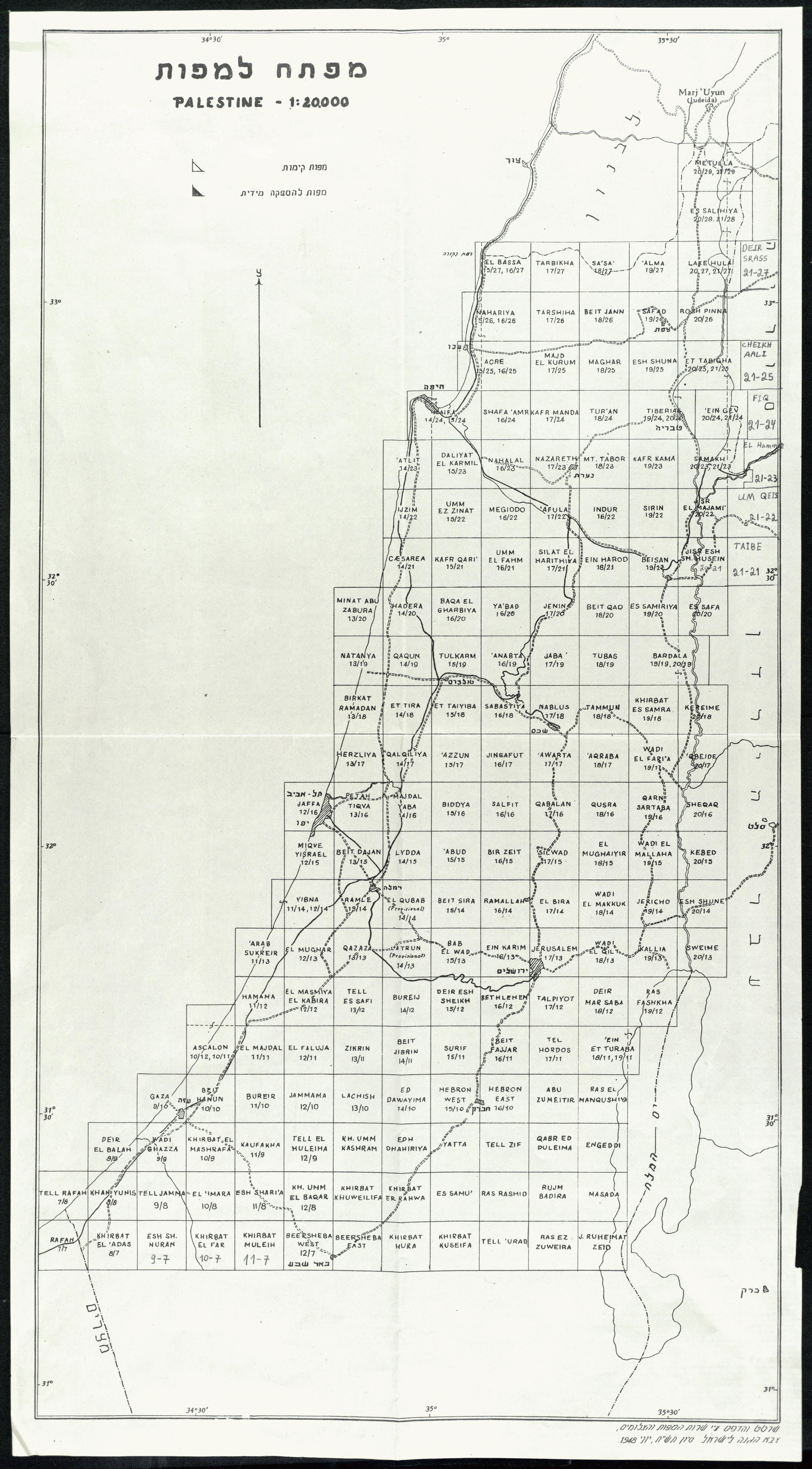
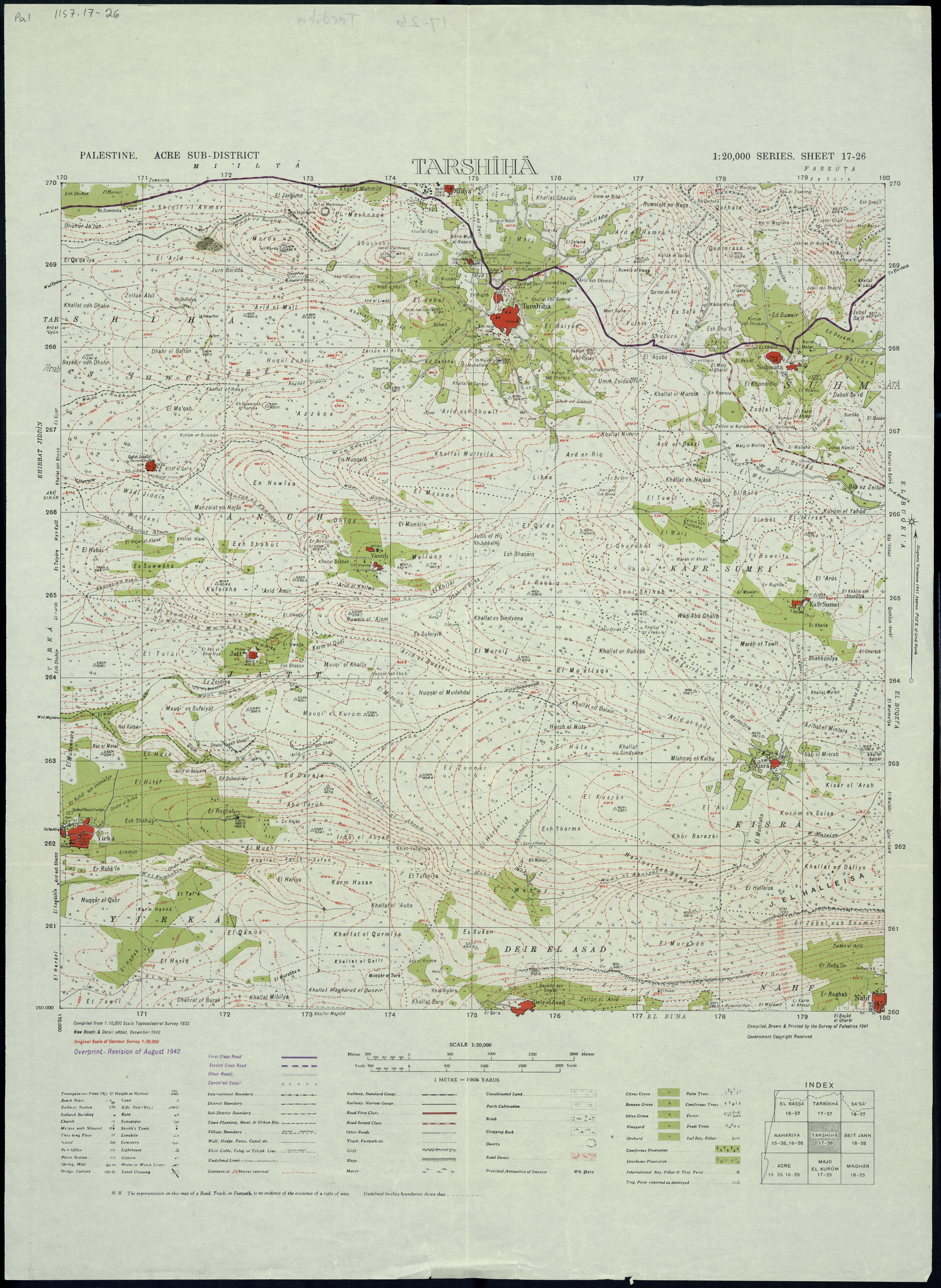
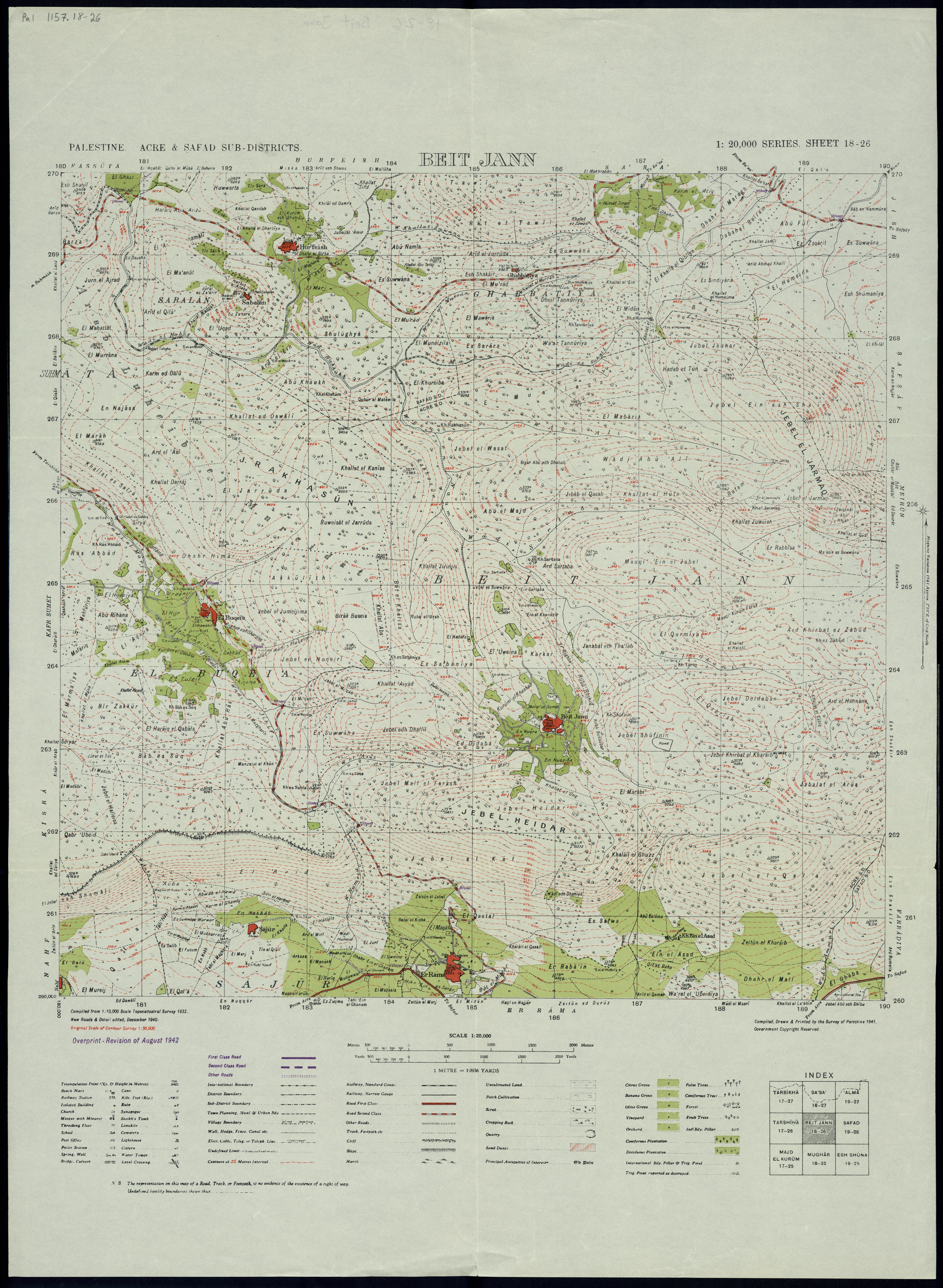
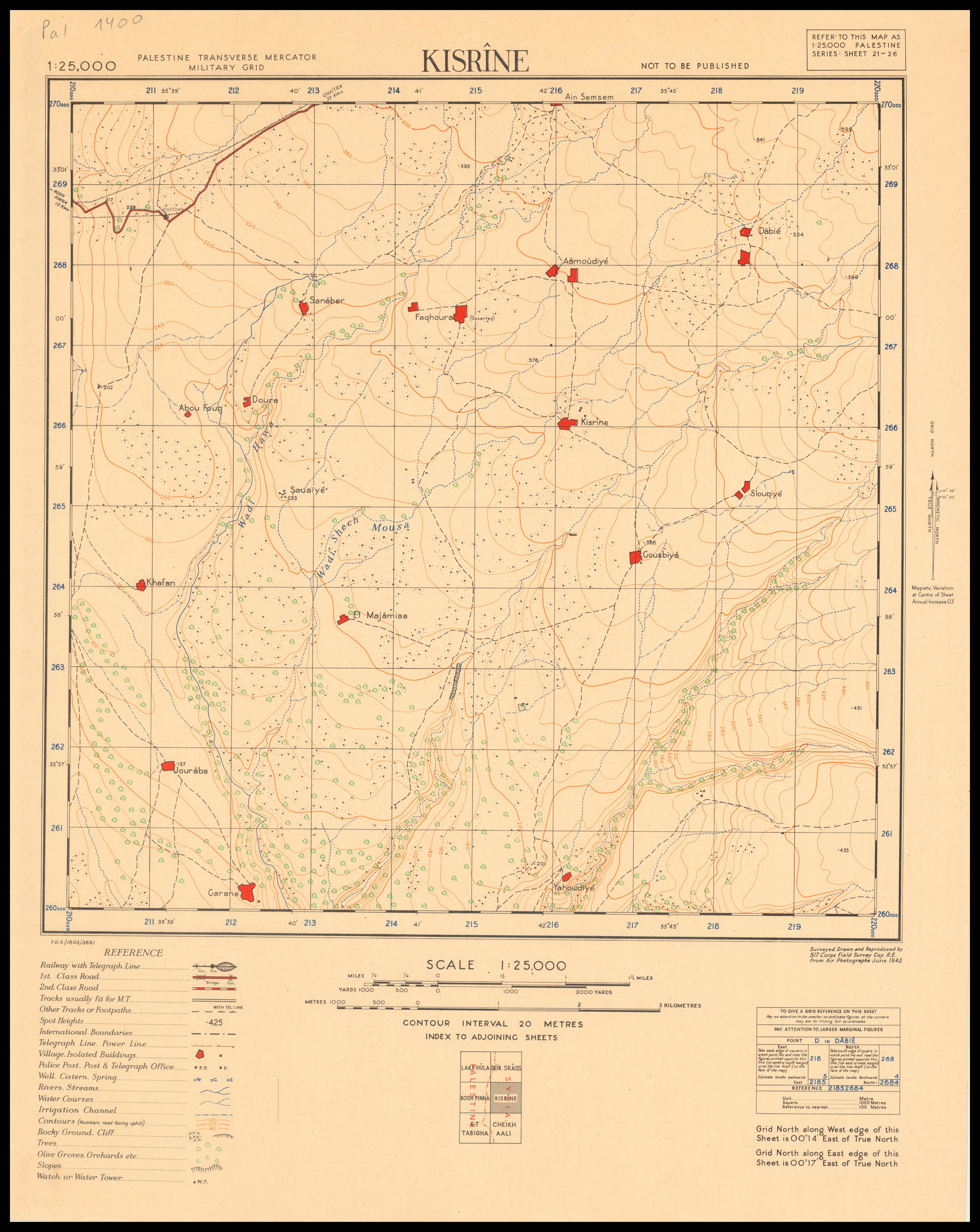
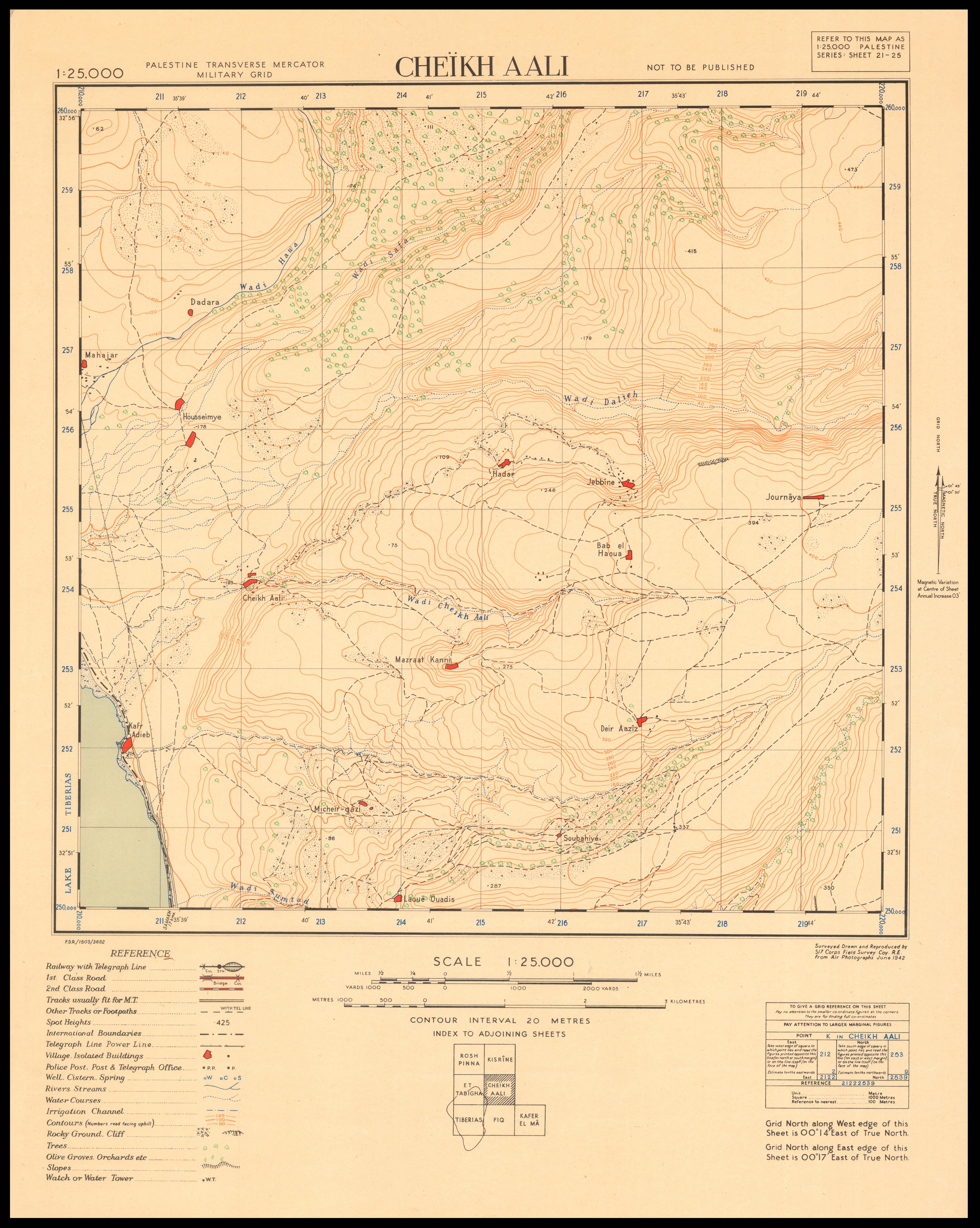
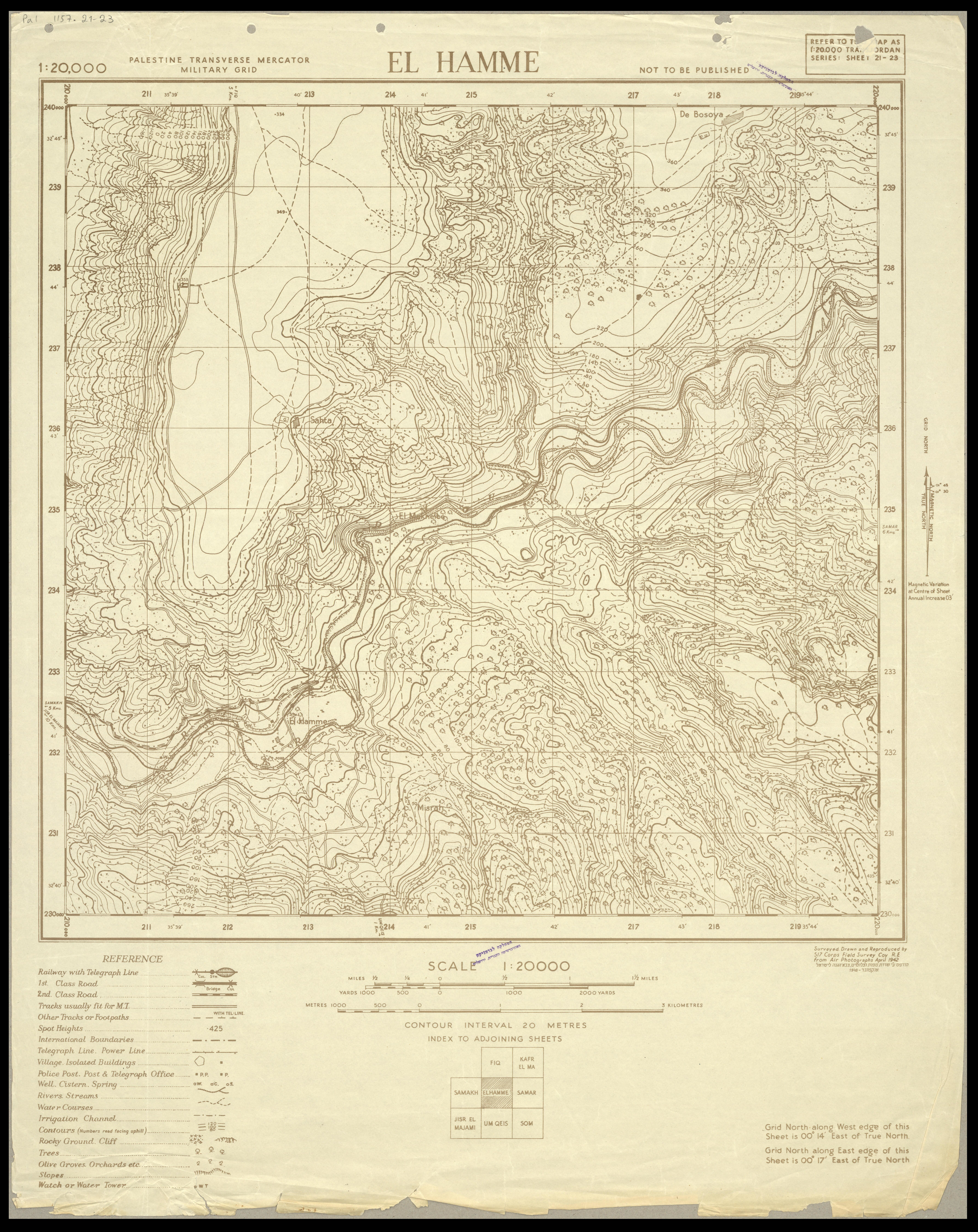
	7	8	9	10	11	12	13	14	15	16	17	18	19	20	21
29
28
27
26
25
24
23
22
21
20
19
18
17
16
15
14
13
12
11
10
9
8
7

== See also ==
- Cartography of Palestine
- Cartography of Jerusalem

== Bibliography ==
- Abu Sitta, Salman (2006). "Map and Grab". Journal of Palestine Studies. XXXV (2): 101–102. ISSN 0377-919X.
- Arden-Close, C. F. (1942). "Maps of Palestine". Empire Survey Review. 6 (46): 501. doi:10.1179/sre.1942.6.46.501. (subscription required)
- Essaid, Aida (4 December 2013). "Land Settlement, Surveys and Disputes". Zionism and Land Tenure in Mandate Palestine. Routledge. pp. 97–102. ISBN 978-1-134-65361-4.
- Gavish, Dov (2005). "The first maps based on origin surveys". A Survey of Palestine Under the British Mandate, 1920–1948. RoutledgeCurzon Studies in Middle East History. London and New York: RoutledgeCurzon. ISBN 978-0-7146-5651-9.
- Gavish, Dov; Kark, Ruth (1993). "The Cadastral Mapping of Palestine, 1958–1928". The Geographical Journal. 159 (1): 70–80. Bibcode:1993GeogJ.159...70G. doi:10.2307/3451491. JSTOR 3451491.
- Mitchell, Andrew Park (1942). "Survey of Palestine: The First Twenty Years". Empire Survey Review. 6 (45): 388–392. doi:10.1179/sre.1942.6.45.388.
- Salmon, F.J. (1937). "The Modern Geography of Palestine". Palestine Exploration Quarterly. 69 (1): 33–42. doi:10.1179/sre.1938.4.28.334. (subscription required)
- H. B. T. (1948). "Palestine Department of Surveys". Empire Survey Review. 9 (69): 324–325. doi:10.1179/sre.1948.9.69.324. (subscription required)
