= Survey of Israel =

Israeli national mapping agency

Coordinates: 32°04′04″N 34°46′51″E

Survey of Israel - SOI (Hebrew: מפ"י - המרכז למיפוי ישראל, MAPI – HaMerkaz LeMipui Yisra'el) is the survey and mapping department of the Israeli Ministry of Housing and Construction. It is the successor of the Survey Department of Palestine, which existed in Mandatory Palestine between 1920 and 1948.

== History ==
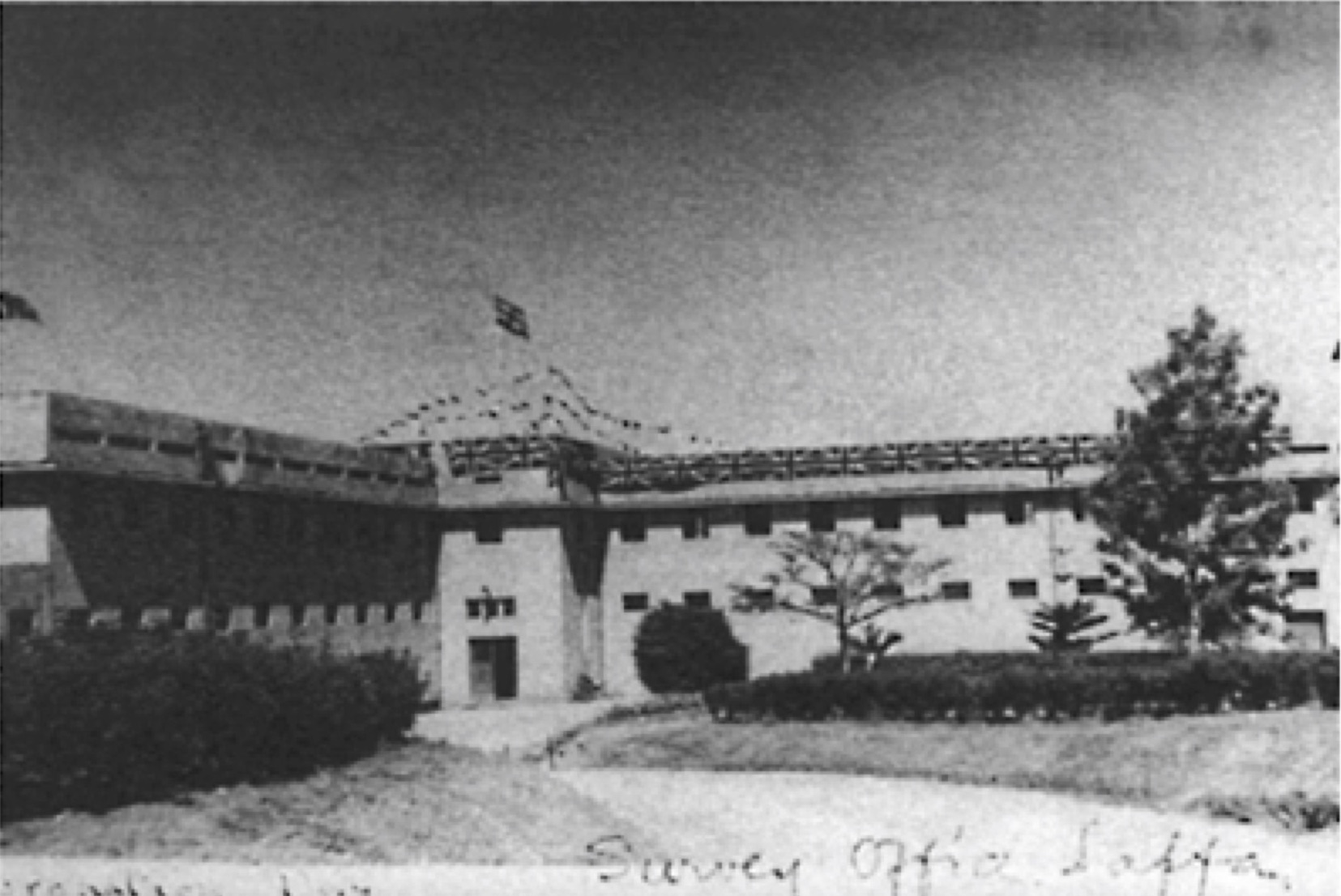
The Survey Department of Palestine in 1930

The British Mandate established the country's first survey department in 1920, known as the Survey Department of Palestine. In 1930, a building was erected to house the department at the southern end of a 30-acre plot near the German Templar cemetery in Tel Aviv. During World War II, it was used by the British Army. Today, the main office of the Survey of Israel is located in Tel Aviv with branches in Jerusalem, Be'er Sheva, Haifa and Nazareth.

== Survey of Israel responsibilities ==
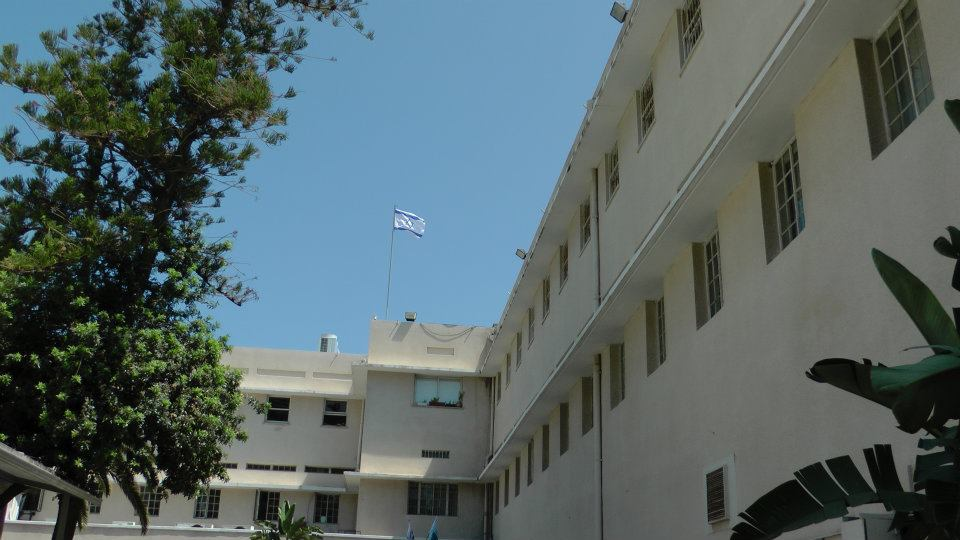
The Survey of Israel building today at 1, Lincoln St, Tel Aviv

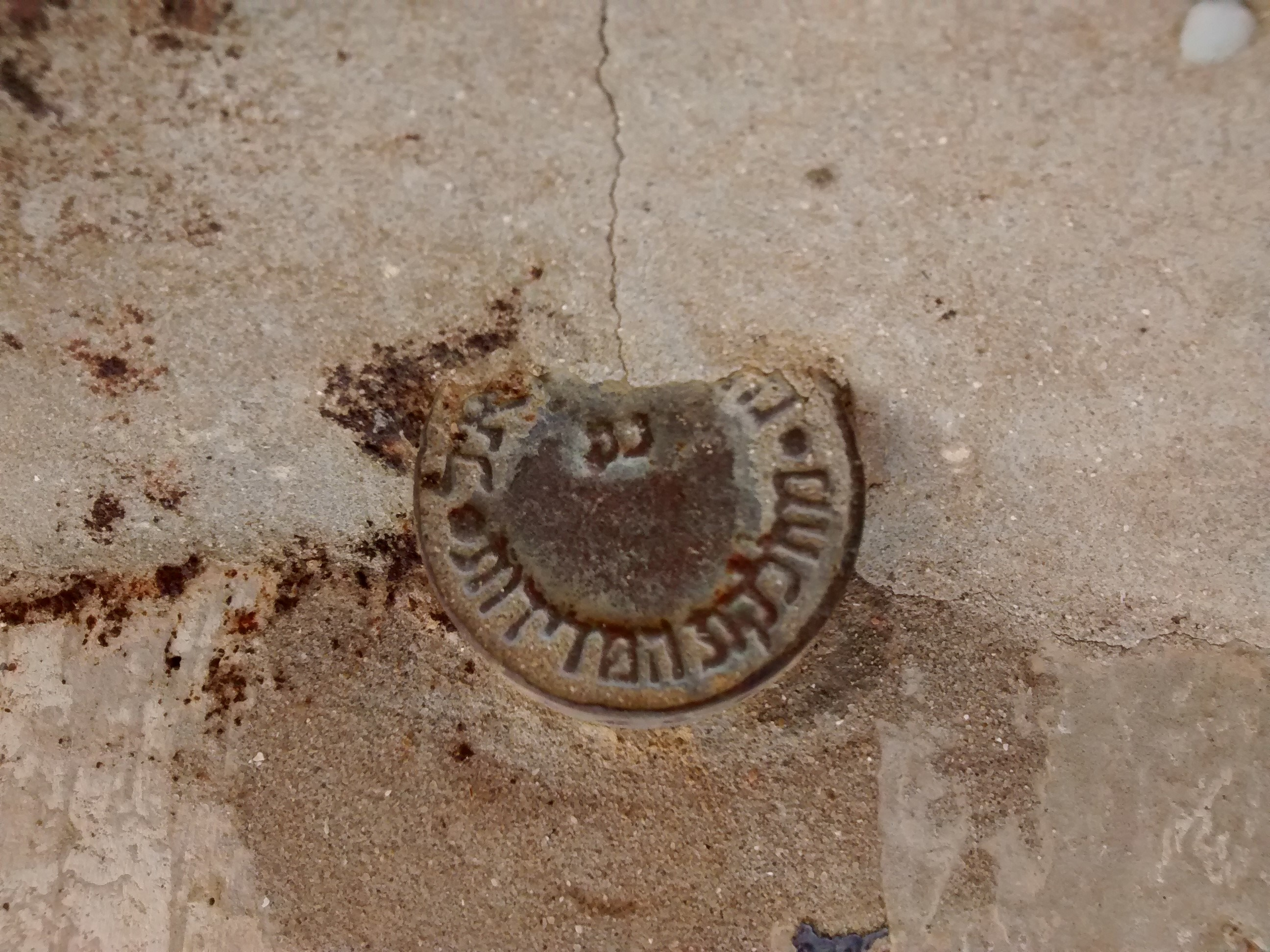
Measurement point number 1974 made by the Survey of Israel, located in Ein Shemer old courtyard

The Survey of Israel is the government agency for mapping, geodesy, cadastre and geoinformatics. The Survey is responsible for the national infrastructure in these areas as well as for a number of official functions.

In the field of geodesy, the Survey operates as the National Geodetic Institute, adopting the reference ellipsoid, developing and maintaining the geodetic control network, defining the national datum, both horizontal and vertical and establishing an appropriate projection with accompanying mapping equations and transformations, for applications in mapping, cadastre and geoinformatics.

In the realm of cadastre the Survey leads activities leading to land registration (Land Surveys Department). The registration of rights to land is based on Torrens principles, which in effect provides a state guarantee of the rights registered. The Survey is responsible for defining boundaries of blocks and parcels in terms of coordinates and plans. All these procedures are anchored by Survey Ordinances.

95% of the country's area has undergone the settlement process. All this area is subdivided into approximately 15,000 blocks and 800,000 parcels. The Survey deals every year with the continuation of settlement and also with new subdivision (re-parcellation) which express mutation in rights to land or its use, or both.

The Survey of Israel is the national mapping agency, responsible for defining mapping products required, with a special attention to construction infrastructures, security and emergency services, environmental protection, tourism and research and development.

These tasks require the establishment of standards, coordinate networks including specifications for map projections, accuracy standards, practice of toponymy and symbology.

The standard map series at the present is the 1:50,000, from which the 1:100,000 series is derived. The present editions of these series were produced by analogical methods and revised by digital methods. In addition, a number of 1:25,000 maps have been produced, all based on the National GIS digital data files, managed by the Survey. All map series are in the stage of transition to a digital cartographic process. Additional products worth mentioning are town plans and the Atlas of Israel being produced with the cooperation of the Hebrew University of Jerusalem.

The topic of geoinformatics has been entrusted to the Survey by government decisions of 1990 and 1993, meaning that the Survey is responsible for the National GIS databank, including a uniform set of codes to ensure compatibility and an interministerial forum which is a platform for discussion and formulation of policy.

The National GIS includes a topographic data bank, derived from aerial photographs at the scale 1:40,000 and periodically revised. The data bank consists of 10 data layers with appropriate codes. There is also a cadastral data bank, based on cadastral maps and plans. It is used to supply information and to manage cadastral operations, but it has no legal standing equal to the original documents. In addition, there is a bank of addresses, in larger population centers, managed in cooperation with the Israel Central Bureau of Statistics, which is in charge of periodic censuses.

== Early detailed maps (1950s–1960s) in 1:20,000 scale ==
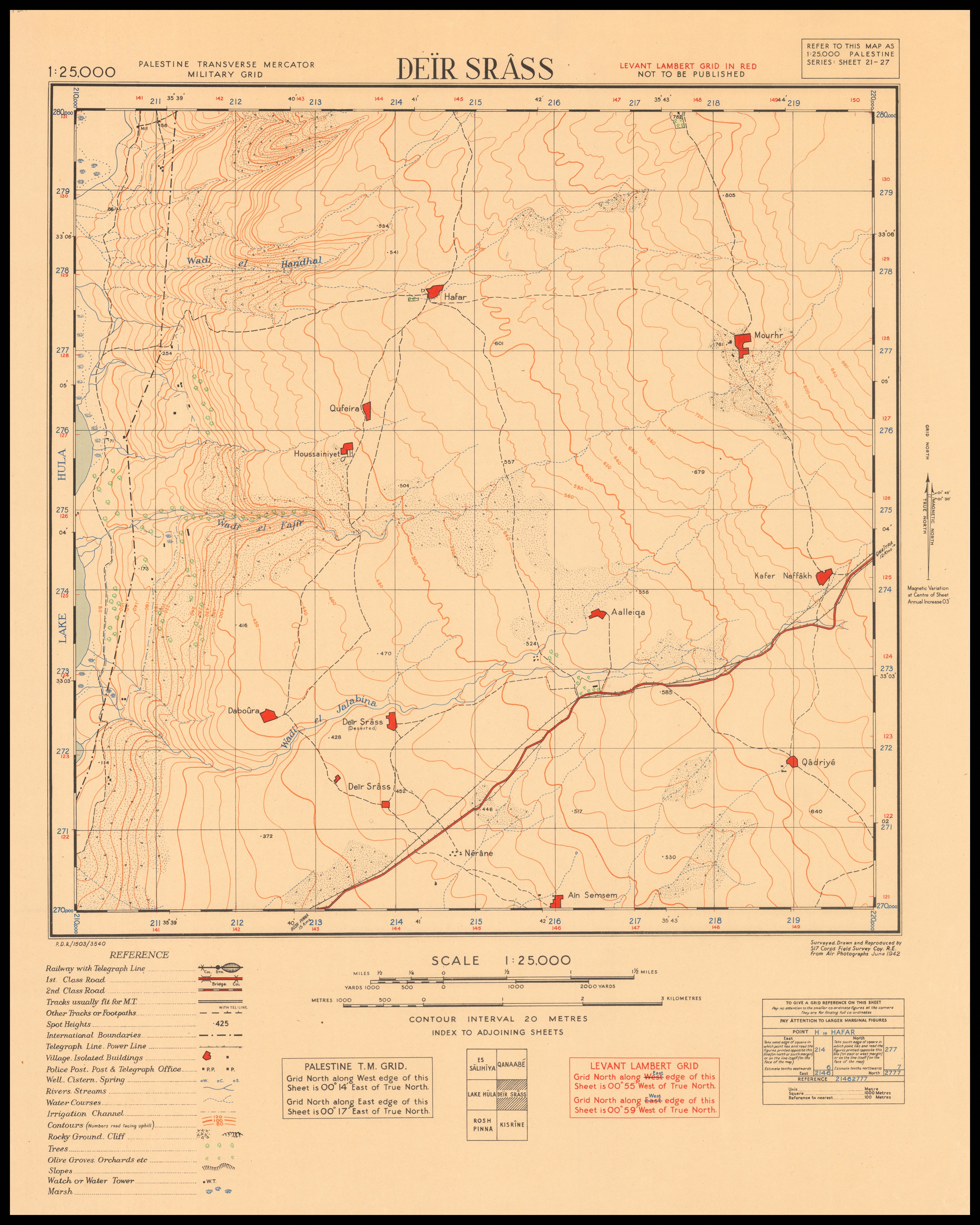
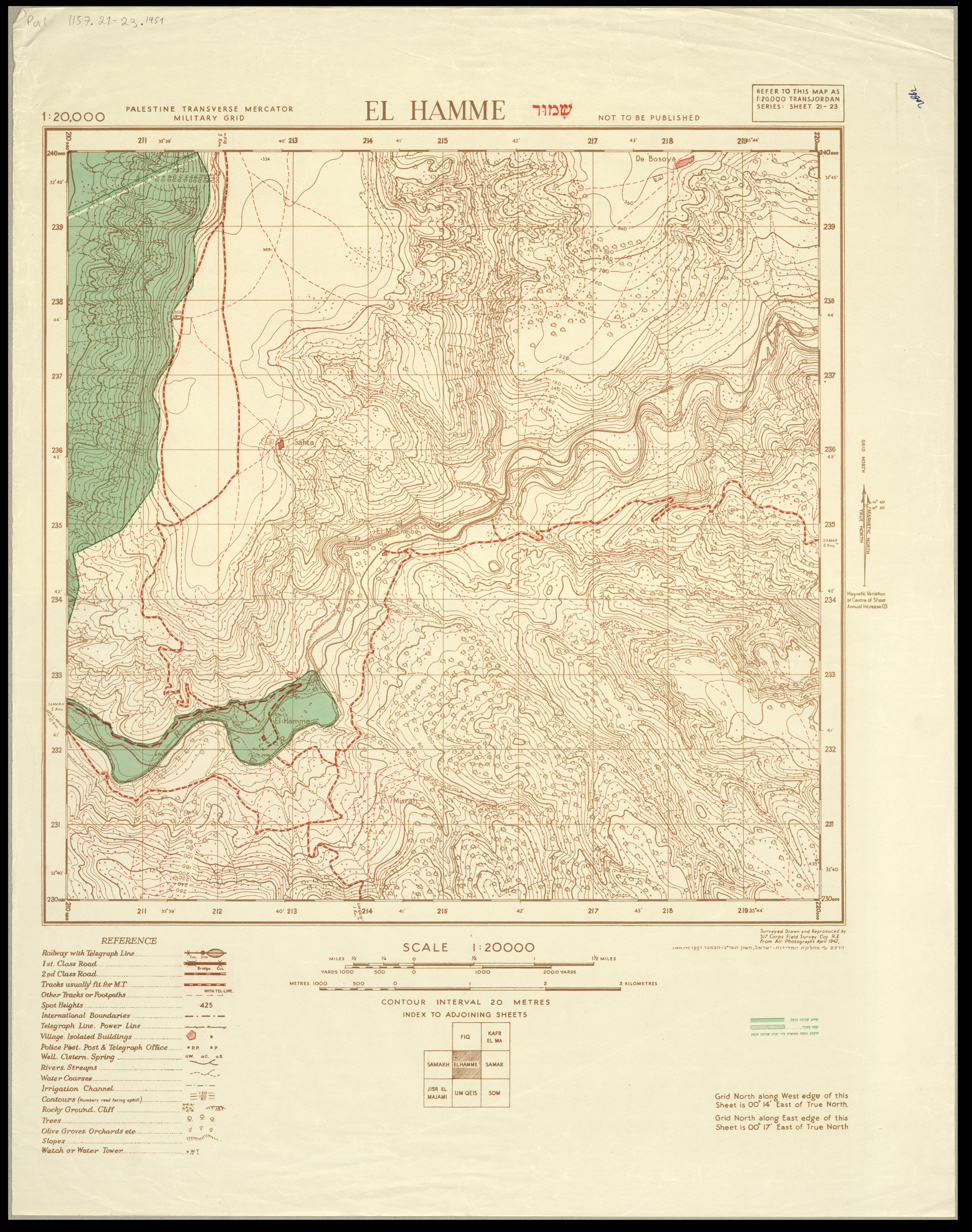
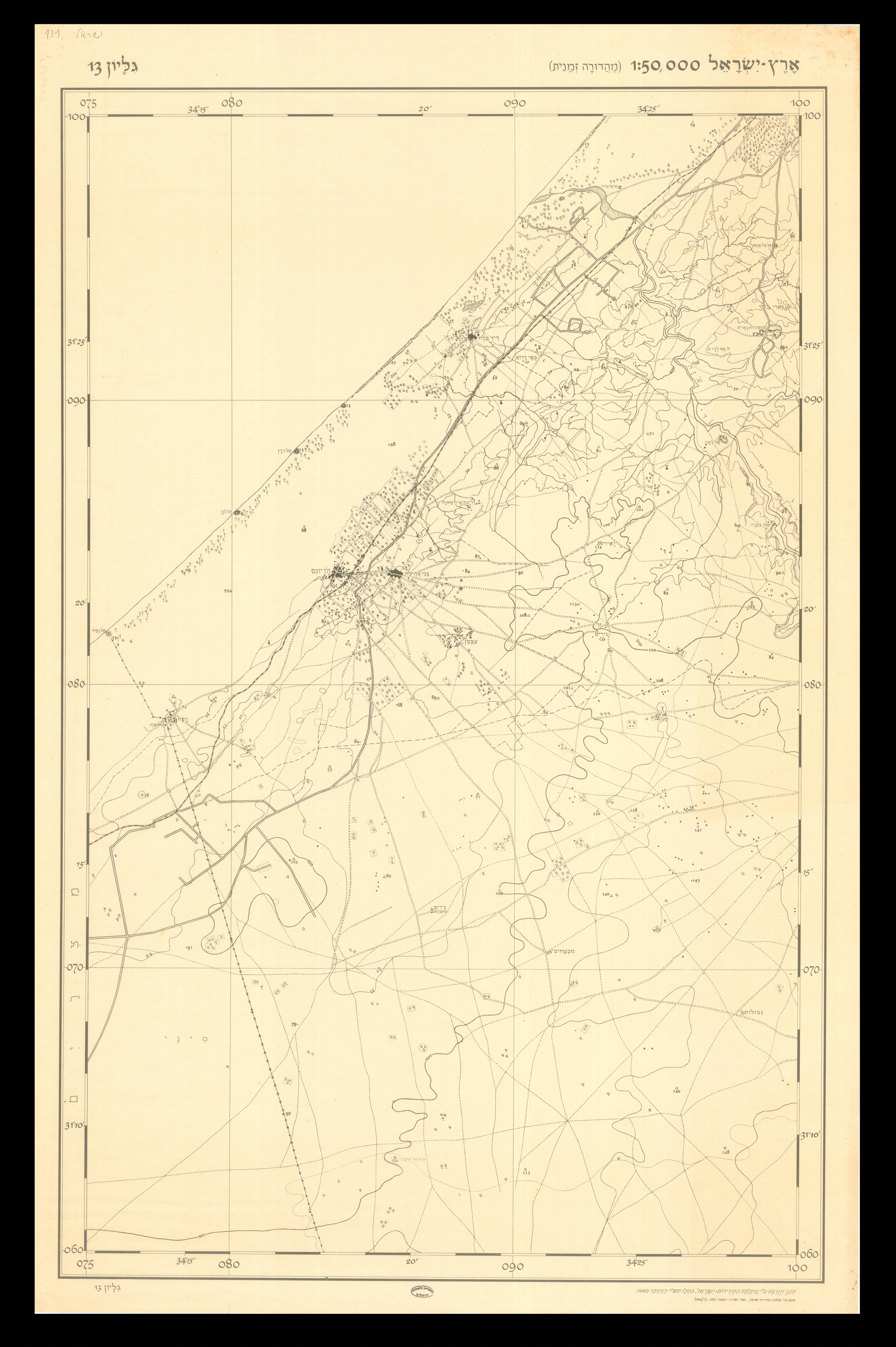
| | 7 | 8 | 9 | 10 | 11 | 12 | 13 | 14 | 15 | 16 | 17 | 18 | 19 | 20 | 21 |
|---|---|---|---|---|---|---|---|---|---|---|---|---|---|---|---|
| 29 |
| 28 |
| 27 |
| 26 |
| 25 |
| 24 |
| 23 |
| 22 |
| 21 |
| 20 |
| 19 |
| 18 |
| 17 |
| 16 |
| 15 |
| 14 |
| 13 |
| 12 |
| 11 |
| 10 |
| 9 |
| 8 |
| 7 |
| 6 |
| 5 |
| 4 |
| 3 |
| 2 |
| 1 |
| 0 |
| -88 |

== See also ==
- Cartography of Israel
- Cartography of Jerusalem
