= Mark Chamberlain (photographer) =

American photographer

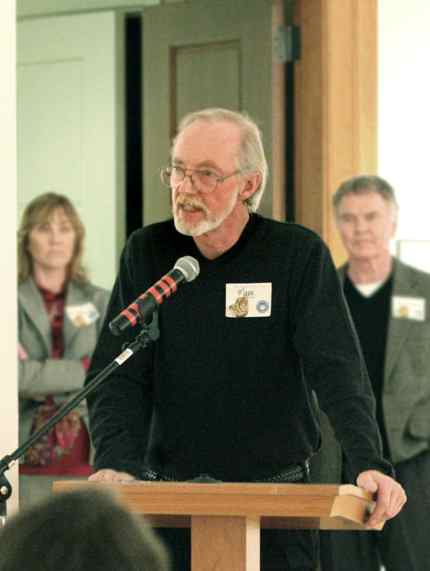
Mark Chamberlain at Soka U. Jan. 2010

Mark Phineas Chamberlain (July 16, 1942 – April 23, 2018) was an American photographer, installation artist, gallery owner and curator. Born and raised in Dubuque, Iowa, he received his BA in Political Science in 1965, and Master in Operations Research in 1967, from the University of Iowa. Chamberlain was drafted into the U.S. Army in 1967 and stationed in Korea during the American War in Vietnam. On discharge from the army, he changed his previous career course to become a photographic artist. He explained, "While stationed overseas, I picked up a camera to maintain my sanity and provide a creative outlet. I also took classes in Korean language and history and found a photography mentor in the military crafts program. Returning home, I had a growing desire to find an outlet for this newfound passion." In 1969, Chamberlain moved to Southern California, aspiring to open a photographic art gallery.

Mark Chamberlain co-founded BC Space Gallery and Photographic Art Services, in Laguna Beach, California in 1973 with Jerry Burchfield, and operated the space solely from 1987 until his death in 2018. The venue hosted community, political, and solstice events, theatrical and musical performances.

With BC as a base of operations, Chamberlain and Burchfield co-founded “Laguna Canyon Project: The Continuous Document” (1980-2010) to record changes to Laguna Canyon over time. A crucial phase of this project was The Tell photographic mural, which in 1989 became the site of a large demonstration that helped avert the development of the area into a massive housing community. The site was later incorporated into Laguna Coast Wilderness Park.

In 2002, the art partners co-founded "The Legacy Project," which documented the transition of Marine Corps Air Station El Toro into the Orange County Great Park. "The Legacy Project" members, ultimately numbering six, created The Great Picture, one of the largest photographs in the world made as a single seamless image.

On October 22, 2014, Mark Chamberlain received a Helena Modjeska Cultural Legacy Award as an “Artistic Visionary” from Arts Orange County. The award was presented at the Samueli Theater, Segerstrom Center for the Arts, Costa Mesa, CA.

== Career highlights ==
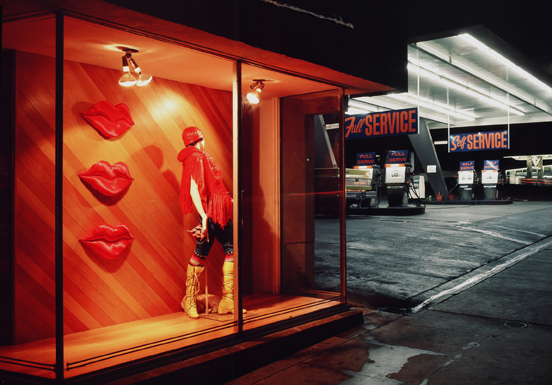
Lip Service "Future Fossils Series by Mark Chamberlain December 1975

Mark Chamberlain moved to Laguna Beach in the fall of 1970. On December 25 through the 27th, 1970 he attended the town's "Christmas Happening" (concert and love-in) in the Sycamore Hills area. The event drew about 25,000 flower children in attendance. His photographs of the event and its aftermath have been displayed and published in several venues and publications. In 2012, Laguna Beach Magazine published an article using some of these images, and produced a video with Chamberlain discussing the event and showing several more images.

Mark Chamberlain's first major body of work, Dubuque Passages, begun in 1972 and was intimate black and white photographic artwork of his hometown. In the mid-1970s, he added color to his film palette and began Future Fossils, a social commentary work on the Southern California urban landscape. He soon began his Dream Sequences series; lyrical figurative photos in vibrant color with erotic overtones. In 1979, he began Looking for 2000; an ongoing companion color series to Future Fossils photographic images, reflecting our evolution into the twenty-first century. He created thousands of images into the twenty-first century, including photographs for the "Laguna Canyon Project," The Tell, and "The Legacy Project."

A solo retrospective of Chamberlain's 40-year artistic career, “Reflections of an Armchair Arteologist," was held in early 2010 at Soka University, Aliso Viejo, California. The exhibition included more than 150 artworks including Dubuque Passages, Future Fossils, Looking for 2000, other photographic series, collage and assemblage pieces.

His photographic artwork is included in the collections of the Laguna Art Museum, the Orange County Museum of Art, the University of Dubuque, the Dubuque Museum of Art (In Spring 2021, the museum exhibited “2100 and Counting: Looking at the Collection in the 21st Century,” including six of Chamberlain's Dubuque Passages photos.), the Polaroid Collection, the Cincinnati Art Museum, and in many other public and private venues. His and Burchfield's chromogenic color print, Primary Light Documentation (1983), was displayed at the Orange County Museum of Art in the exhibition, “California Landscape into Abstraction.” Chamberlain was a longtime supporter of and exhibitor at the Laguna Art Museum Annual Auction. He also worked actively to oppose this museum's proposed 1996 merger with the former Newport Harbor Art Museum, now the Orange County Museum of Art. He was a frequent contributor to local publications, including images for Laguna Beach Magazine.

He was an Adjunct Faculty at Saddleback College (1979–90), Orange Coast College (1980–90), and Cypress College (1991–2010). He conducted workshops and lectures at the University of California, Irvine, University of California, Riverside, California State University, Fullerton, California State University, Long Beach, and the University of Dubuque. He was a panelist and presenter at Society for Photographic Education conferences (1981, 1989, 2007).

== BC Space ==
In 1973, Mark Chamberlain co-founded, with Jerry Burchfield, BC Space Gallery in Laguna Beach, CA. Lynn Smith wrote in the Los Angeles Times in 1983, “They rented an original Masonic Lodge building on Forest Avenue and set up a studio that specialized in art reproduction, restoration of old photos and custom laboratory work. BC Space was not your typical ‘do it yesterday’ sort of operation, and their regular clientele soon settled into those who, like them, appreciated a relaxed approach to creativity and allowed them the time to do their own work. As Chamberlain put it, ‘one great big playground under one roof.'”

In 1976, the partners formally converted the BC foyer area into a contemporary fine art photography gallery. By then the photo lab and studio services were capable of supporting a modest gallery with monthly exhibitions—many infused with political, social, and environmental messages.

Burchfield and Chamberlain held an auction at BC Space in 1981. Linda Bellon wrote: “They planned an auction to support the building of a second gallery room. The auction's success depended on the photographers enlisted to donate prints…260 pieces by 150 artists from across the country arrived at BC Space! The support from the photography community was overwhelming. The gallery was virtually converted into a museum where visitors spent three to four hours viewing prints by Matthew Brady, Imogen Cunningham, George Hurrel, Philippe Halsman, André Kertész, and Helmut Newton, as well as work by young artists from California. A tremendous amount of hard work, artist support, and volunteer help secured the auction's success and financed the second gallery room.”

Among the venue's many accomplishments was its 1984 printing of the Orange County Register Los Angeles Olympics photographs. BC processed and matted the images to museum standards, creating the visual presentation for which the Register won that year's Pulitzer Prize.

In April 1986, BC Space exhibited the Hollywood celebrity photographs of Holly Wright and Karl Gernot Kuehn, along with a poetry reading by Wright's husband, the award-winning poet Charles Wright. (In 2014, Charles Wright was named Poet Laureate of the United States by the Library of Congress.)

After Burchfield left BC Space in 1987 to pursue a teaching career, Chamberlain expanded the gallery's perspectives, exhibiting other visual and performance media on an equal footing with photography. “Ideas and issues expressed through art became more important to me than displaying just one medium,” he explained. “Besides, photography had gained its place in the art world.”

In 1989, BC Space presented "The Third One Out: Reflections of Planet Earth." In 1997, “BC XXIII: Committed to the Light” was a more traditional overview of contemporary photographic art. BC shows since 2001 have been more stridently political. These include: “Banned & Barred” (2001), dealing with the practice of censorship in art; “Water Works” (2001), addressing concerns of water use, misuse, and abuse; “Urbanscapes” (2002), a lyrical depiction of man's impact and legacy on our planet; “Pretty Lies/Dirty Truths” (2003), addressing issues of war & peace in our time; “Wheels of Justice” tour (2004), presented by members of Voices in the Wilderness, the Palestine Right to Return Coalition, the Middle East Children's Alliance, and affiliates of the International Solidarity Movement; “For Shame” (2005), comparing definitions of obscenity in art with politics: “Beyond Borders: Southern Exposure – Opening Boundaries” (2007), featuring politically-oriented photographs of Latin America by James Lerager, with social commentary poster work by Doug Minkler; and “My Father's Party is Busted” (2008), presaging the rise of the Republican Tea Party.

In 2010, BC Space's exhibition history was displayed at Grand Central Art Center gallery (California State University Fullerton), Santa Ana, CA in “BC Space: Mything in Action.” Bill Lasarow, ArtScene editor, wrote in April 2010, “It is heartening to see an artist like Mark Chamberlain gaining regional recognition for a more than a 40-year body of work distinguished as much for its community and collaborative nature as its pure aesthetic achievement. There is a moral dimension to his work that is especially deserving of wider attention.” Daniella Walsh reviewed this exhibition. A book of the same name was published in 2013.

Subsequent BC Space exhibitions included: “Homeless in Paradise” (2011), featuring photographs of the homeless in Southern California; Capital Crime$ (2012), a mixed media exhibition including work by over 60 artists, exploring the use and misuse of money in our culture; and “Autumnal Recollections With Our Friend Paul” (2013), an artistic retrospective of the 92-year-old Laguna Beach icon, Paul Darrow, a painter, assemblage artist, photographer, cartoonist, sailor and musician; he was included in Getty Foundation sponsored 2011-2012 Pacific Standard Time exhibitions at the Pasadena Museum of California Art and at the Los Angeles County Museum of Art. From February 25 through April 26, 2014, BC Space presented “Silent But Deadly: Chernobyl-Fukushima-San Onofre,” addressing the fact that some 400 commercial nuclear power reactors are operational around the world, 100 of them in the United States. (See Chernobyl disaster, Fukushima Daiichi nuclear disaster, San Onofre Nuclear Generating Station.)

== Laguna Canyon Project ==
The "Laguna Canyon Project: The Continuous Document" (1980-2010) was a photographic documentation of Laguna Canyon Road, the main access route from the Santa Ana Freeway, CA off-ramp to the Pacific Ocean. Chamberlain explained, “We wanted to create a broader awareness of regional and global environmental issues. While developers viewed the unoccupied land as virgin territory ripe for development, we felt it imperative to question the prevailing conceptions of progress, and used photography, and later video, sculpture, performance, installations, and collaborative events to address these concerns." The Project can also loosely be described as a work of environmental art.

In 1980, Burchfield and Chamberlain began documenting the entire Laguna Canyon Road. Lynn Smith wrote in the Los Angeles Times in 1983, “The project started three years ago when the pair photographed both sides of the Canyon in daylight, walking along the scenic nine-mile road in nine hours. The result was two color photographs, each made up of 646 frames and stretching out for 267 feet. Phase 2 was a ‘Documentation of the Daylight Document,’ in which the photos were taken back to Laguna Canyon Road and photographed in the environment in which they were made. For Phase 3, they photographed the Canyon at night, and Phase 4 was another documentation of the document, complete with ceremonial placement of flashing lights atop the photographs, laid out at night along the road. Each phase determined what the next would be. What began as a straightforward record of environmental change became more complicated, involving more and more helpers, public workers, and politicians. But it became clear to them that spectators and passers-by—waving, swearing, and in one case being rescued by the photographers after a car accident—were becoming part of their artistic process."

Cathy Curtis wrote in the Los Angeles Times in 1989, “Their zeal is fueled not so much by aesthetic concerns as by a passionate desire to preserve the future of what Chamberlain has described as ‘the last remaining natural corridor to the Pacific Ocean in Orange County and one of the largest natural open spaces in Southern California.’” The concluding phase of the "Laguna Canyon Project" was celebratory documentation and walk off the nine-mile Laguna Canyon Road. The photographic journey, held on June 21, 2010, took nine hours and 15 minutes.

From October 18, 2015, through January 17, 2016, an exhibition on the Project, titled "The Canyon Project: Artivism," was held at Laguna Art Museum, Laguna Beach, California.

=== The Tell ===
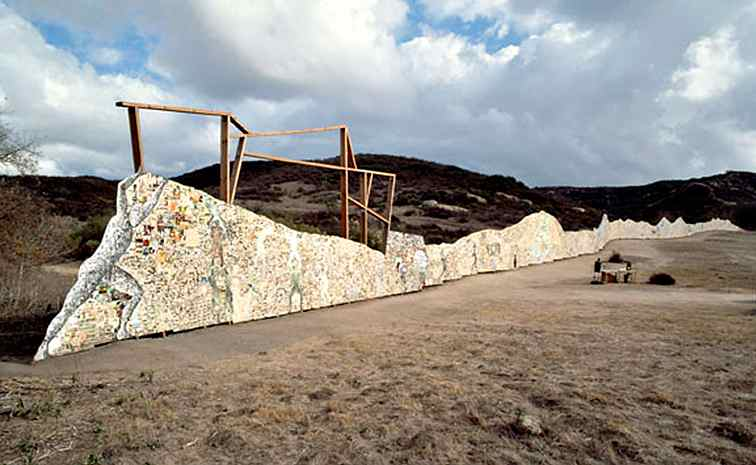
The Tell by Mark Chamberlain December 1989

The Tell photomural, a collaborative non-profit public art project, was Phase VIII of the "Laguna Canyon Project." In 1989, Chamberlain and Burchfield, along with hundreds of supporters, conceived of and created The Tell. This 636-foot-long photographic mural served as the focal point for the defense of Laguna Canyon. The installation attracted national media attention, including CNN, Life magazine, and numerous articles in the Los Angeles Times, and ultimately helped facilitate the public purchase of that land for preservation.

Chamberlain wrote in “The Laguna Canyon Project: Documenting Countrycide,” Journal of Orange County Studies in 1988, “In the spring of 1989, with the help of a number of fellow artists and a crew of dedicated supporters, we plan to create and install Phase VIII of the Laguna Canyon Road in the Sycamore Hills region of Laguna Canyon. We have entitled this, the largest and most complex and most visible phase of our project, The Tell."

The word “Tell” is based on the archeological term for a mound of artifacts from prior civilizations. The Tell consisted of thousands of photographs donated by people from across the country; these were woven together into an historical narrative of mankind's relationship to the land. At 34-feet high, dwindling down to the ground, it echoed the shape of the surrounding canyons, while a stylized Easter Island head served as its physical and philosophical foundation.

On November 11, 1989, The Tell supporters coordinated with environmental groups to host a Walk to The Tell site. The purpose of the Walk and Demonstration, attended by an estimated 9,000 to 11,000 people, was to protest the already mapped-out 2,150-acre “Laguna Laurel” housing project (and the nearby San Joaquin Toll Road). Plans included 3,200 housing units, a shopping mall, and numerous businesses. Largely as a consequence of this reportedly the largest environmental demonstration in Orange County, CA, the housing development was canceled, the land was purchased from the Irvine Company, and was dedicated in perpetuity as Laguna Coast Wilderness Park in 1993. The San Joaquin Toll Road proved unstoppable, however, and construction began on this now scarcely traveled road the following year. After construction was commenced, Chamberlain and Burchfield engaged in a day-long performance art piece at the site of the road, that today runs adjacent to the wilderness region.

The Tell was disassembled and put into storage in 1990. Most sections were destroyed in the Laguna wildfire of 1993. But by then, The Tell had become a fixture in local folklore. And it still is!

== The Legacy Project and The Great Picture ==
Burchfield and Chamberlain's extensive documentation of Laguna Canyon led naturally to their involvement with the El Toro Marine Corps Air Station, and to the future of the base's 4,700 contiguous undeveloped acres in Irvine, California. In 1993, the U.S. Department of Defense announced the decommissioning of that air base; and for more than a decade, political battles ensued regarding its future. In 2005, Orange County Great Park proponents finally prevailed, and plans were slated for its transformation into public parkland.

Chamberlain and Burchfield had been shooting the marine base since 2002; in 2005, they formally created “The Legacy Project,” with fellow photographers, Jacques Garnier, Rob Johnson, Douglas McCulloh and Clayton Spada. The stated mission of “The Legacy Project” was to document the evolution of the base into The Great Park over the next decade. The six Project members have amassed hundreds of thousands of photographs of homes, schools, churches, theaters, and playgrounds of the city within a city, occupied by Marines and their families since the early 1940s, as well as runways, hangars, and distant mountain ranges.

“The Legacy Project's” largest artwork/installation is the 3 stories high by 11 stories wide “The Great Picture,” one of the largest photographs in the world made as a single seamless image. In 2006, Project members plus 400 volunteers, other artists, and engineers converted a jet maintenance hangar into a giant Camera obscura. They then achieved their exposure through a 6-millimeter pinhole lens onto a light sensitive muslin canvas. After a 35-minute exposure, the crew captured a black-and-white negative image that they processed in an Olympic-pool-size developing tray. The resulting gelatin silver photographic print depicts the control tower structures, tarmac and the distant San Joaquin Hills. The giant photograph has been on display at: Art Center College of Design, Wind Tunnel Gallery, Pasadena; the Culver Center of the Arts, University of California Riverside; the China Central Academy of Fine Arts; and the Contemporary Arts Center (New Orleans). The National Air and Space Museum of the Smithsonian Institution, Washington, D.C. displayed "The Great Picture" from April 2014 through the end of that year. Guinness World Records certified the Project's Camera obscura as the largest camera ever recorded.

== Death ==
On April 23, 2018, Chamberlain died of lung cancer at Kaiser Permanente Hospital in Irvine, CA

== Published work ==
"The Laguna Canyon Project: Refining Artivism" (2018). Laguna Wilderness Press, Laguna Beach, California. ISBN 978-0-9840007-4-6

“BC Space: Mything in Action” (2013). 144 pages, 200 color plates. Santa Ana, California, Grand Central Press, Santa Ana, California. ISBN 0981798780.

“Refining the Art of Preservation” (2008). Article in Journal of Aesthetics & Protest 6, Los Angeles. ISBN 978-0-9791377-4-7.

The Legacy Group, “The Edge of Air: Photographs of the Final Days of the Marine Corps Air Station at El Toro.” (2005) Laguna Wilderness Press. ISBN 978-0-9728544-5-0

“The Laguna Canyon Project: Documenting Countrycide” (1988) Journal of Orange County Studies. (See Laguna Canyon Project section, above)
