= Doug Minkler =

American activist poster artist

Doug Minkler is an American artist who is known for his activist posters, which are often created in collaboration with nonprofit organizations and are distributed to the public free of charge.

== Early life and education ==
Minkler was born to working-class parents. He grew up in Palo Alto, California where he claims to have become aware of the division between poor and wealthy people/neighborhoods, often with racial emphasis.

Minkler attended Foothill College in Los Alto Hills, California, and Cal State University, East Bay in Hayward, California.

== Career ==
Minkler's artwork is politically and social justice themed. He works primarily in screenprinting. Many of his posters have been offset printed for large distribution.

He writes of his developing political awareness, "In order to pay for art supplies and necessities, I began a series of what I thought would be temporary factory jobs. At each job I was welcomed to the turbulent shop floor by organizers fluent in Marxist economics and with a serve-the-people art philosophy—all new to me. These dedicated activists were Black Panthers, communist revolutionaries and trade unionists. I soon found myself in the role of shop steward and participated in unionization drives, contract negotiations and strikes. This practical art and class education still guides my work today."

=== Reception ===
According to the Berkeley Daily Planet, "Minkler’s prints are described ... as inspired, not by rugged individualism, but by the collective humor, defiance, and lust for life exhibited by those on the margins.”

Linda Gans writes about Minkler's art, "One of the many striking posters created by prolific Berkeley artist Doug Minkler depicts the dark silhouette of a man — an artist-agitator — wielding a hammer, with this caption: 'Art is not a mirror held up to reality, but a hammer with which to shape it.' That statement, variously attributed both to Bertolt Brecht or to Vladimir Mayakovsky, defines the life work of Doug Minkler, one of the best-known political artists in the Bay Area. In his constant efforts to 'shape reality' by hammering away at war and injustice, Minkler has designed imaginative and highly charged poster artworks for scores of activist groups and labor unions."

Writing for The Tenderloin Times, Mitzi M. Waltz discusses his work,

"Ranging from a soft-focus dusty pastel in support of Nicaraguan coffee pickers to a jagged-edged and brightly colored illustration of a quote from radical German playwright Berthold Brecht, the works are connected mainly by their subject matter—working people, their jobs, their anger, their hopes for the future."

Komotion International Magazine calls Minkler "the prolific Bay Area garage artist." They continue, "Minkler's work is not only humorous at times and aesthetically pleasing, but like much folk art, it is functional and necessary. More importantly, it is accessible to all. His own words express his philosophy best:

“...soon we, (politically conscious artists,) become frustrated and disappointed. Our work has become contrived and cliched; or worse its purpose is completely incomprehensible... For (some), both (art transformed into propaganda or created for organizations) are forms of prostitution, and therefore not true artistic statements. These assumptions ignore centuries of commissioned and political art. This ignorance of art history benefits the status quo. By keeping artists unaware of their rich and revolutionary history they are unlikely to veer from the establishment’s focus on the individual. Our culture praises the individual yet power is invested in the organization. The resulting effect is that artists produce isolated and irrelevant work. At the same time the progressive movement becomes less articulate and culturally weak There is also popular illusion among artists today that creativity in itself stands against militarism, injustice and greed. But creativity is neutral; the uses of creativity are not."

Minkler is listed in the San Francisco Bay Area Progressive Directory and Truthout as an artist who collaborates with nonprofit organizations for fundraising for political and social justice issues. His work is endorsed by Justseeds and has been included the publications Black Commentator and Komotion Live Sc Kicking Sound Mag.

He became creatively active in the 1970s through the 2020s and is one of the historic Emeryville Mudflat sculpture artists.

Minkler is an art educator, teaching to youth in both public school and art center settings. He taught political poster making at California College of Art from 1990.

== Collections ==
A large selection of Minkler's prints can be found in the Center for the Study of Political Graphics.

Minkler's work is held in the collections of Mendocino Art Center, and Oakland Museum of California, among others.
