= List of San Francisco neighborhood newspapers =

Local interest media

- Bernal Heights Journal
- Bernal Heights Pictorial
- Bernal Journal
- New Bernal Journal
- The Bernal Journal
- Mission News
- New Mission News
- North Mission News
- El Tecolote
- Glen Park Association Newsletter
- Glen Park News
- Glen Park Perspective
- Marina Times
- Nob Hill Gazette
- The Noe Valley Voice
- OMI News
- Ingleside-Excelsior Light
- Potrero View
- Richmond ReView
- Sunset Beacon
- West of Twin Peaks Observer
- West Portal Monthly
- St. Mary's Park Bell
- Street Art News
- Telegraph Hill Bulletin
- Telegraph Hill Semaphore
- The Semaphore
- The Telegraph Hill Semaphore
- Tenant Times
- Central City Extra
- The Tenderloin Times
- The New Fillmore
- Visitacion Valley Grapevine
- San Francisco Bay View
- Hoodline
- Mission Local
- 48 Hills
- Beyond Chron
- San Francisco Standard
- San Francisco Public Press
- Sing Tao Daily San Francisco
- San Francisco Independent Journal
- San Francisco Business Times
- The Street Sheet
- The Bold Italic
