= Klencke Atlas =

Large atlas published in 1660

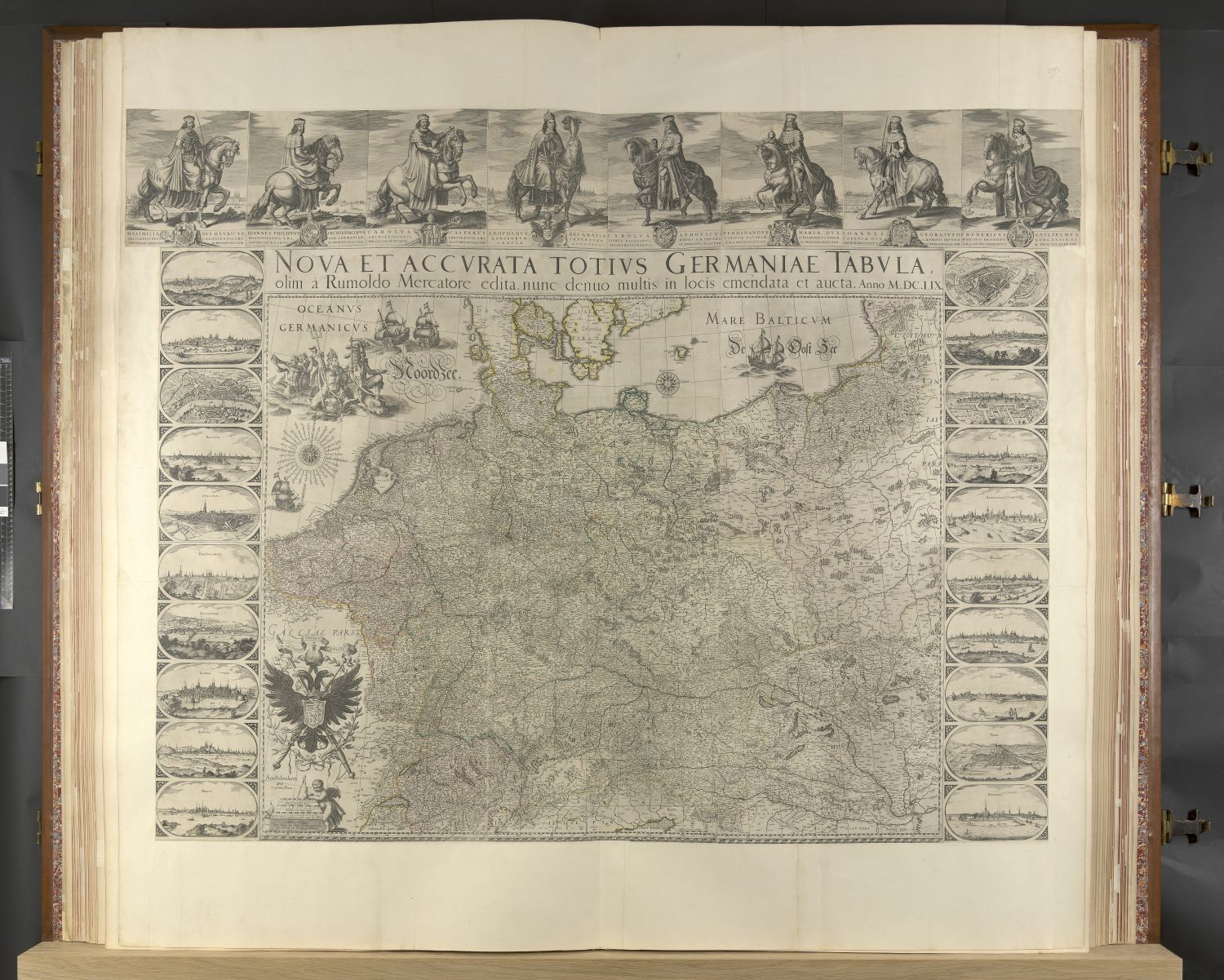
Map of Germany from the Klencke Atlas

The Klencke Atlas, first published in 1660, is one of the world's largest atlases. Originating in The Netherlands, it is 1.75 metres (5 ft 9 in) tall by 1.9 metres (6 ft 3 in) wide when open, and so heavy the British Library needed six people to carry it.

The Atlas was created in the name of John Maurice of Nassau, but it was offered as a gift by Dutch merchants to the map enthusiast Charles II of England in 1660 in order to mark the occasion of the Stuart Restoration to the English throne. It was added to Charles' cabinet of curiosities in Whitehall Palace. In 1828, the Atlas was donated to the British Museum by George IV, along with the maps and atlases which were part of the collection of his deceased father George III.

== Description ==
Klencke Atlas is a singular work; no other copies were created. It is a world atlas made up of 41 copperplate wall maps that remain in exceptionally good condition. The maps were intended to be removed and displayed on the wall. The maps are of the continents and assorted European states and it was said to encompass all the geographical knowledge of the time. Dutch Prince John Maurice of Nassau is credited with its creation, and it contains engravings by artists Joan Blaeu and Hondius and others.

It was presented by a consortium of Dutch sugar merchants, represented by Professor Johannes Klencke, to King Charles II of England in 1660 to mark the occasion of his Restoration to the throne. The consortium likely hoped to gain favourable trade agreements with Britain for slave trade and their sugar plantations. Johannes Klencke was the son of a Dutch merchant family, and an expert on Hugo Grotius. Charles, a map enthusiast, kept it in the 'Cabinet and Closset of rarities' in Whitehall.

== History ==
In 1828, King George IV gave it to the British Museum as part of a larger gift of maps and atlases, the King's Library, collected by his father George III. In the 1950s it was re-bound and restored. Today it is held by the Antiquarian Mapping division of the British Library in London. Since 1998 it was displayed at the entrance lobby of the maps reading room. In April 2010 it was publicly displayed for the first time in 350 years with pages open, at an exhibition at the British Library.

Until 2012 the Klencke Atlas was widely regarded as the world's largest atlas, a record it probably held since the atlas was created 350 years earlier. In February 2012, Australian publisher Gordon Cheers published a new atlas called Earth Platinum that is bigger by about a foot making it probably the largest atlas in the world; 31 copies were made priced at US$100,000 each.

In 2017, the British Library digitized the atlas and made it available online. A video of the digitization process was also made available.
