= Peter Chasseaud =

Peter Chasseaud is a British historian of military cartography. Chasseaud is a fellow of the Royal Geographical Society, a member of the Royal United Services Institute, and the founder of the Historical Military Mapping Group of the British Cartographic Society. His, Mapping the First World War (2013), included maps not published since the end of that conflict.

== Selected publications ==
- Mapping the First World War: The Great War Through Maps From 1914 to 1918. Collins, London, 2013.
