= Emeryville mudflat sculptures =

Found object sculptures in California, USA

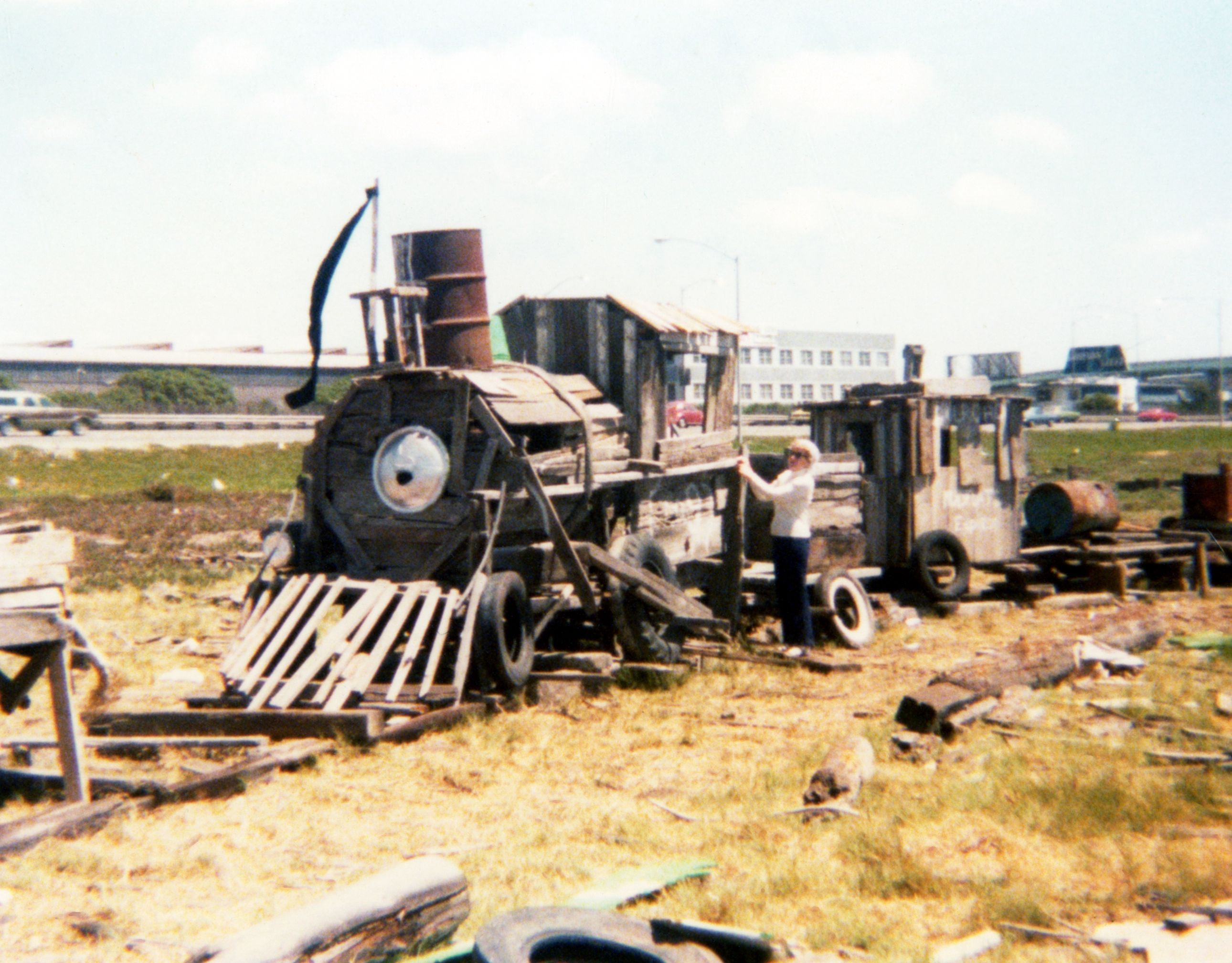
- Mudflat Express, a locomotive model executed in driftwood near Emeryville (1977); sculpture credited to D.A. Puccio and R.D. Kirkpatrick
- Interactive map of Emeryville mudflat sculptures
- Location: Emeryville, California
- Coordinates: 37.835091°N 122.296717°W
- Designer: multiple
- Material: detritus (typically driftwood)
- Beginning date: 1962
- Dismantled date: 1997

The Emeryville mudflat sculptures were a series of found object structures along the San Francisco Bay shoreline of Emeryville, California, largely constructed from discarded materials found on-site such as driftwood. The mudflat sculptures were first erected in 1962 and received national attention by 1964; through the 1960s and 70s, anonymous, usually amateur artists would construct sculptures visible to traffic at the eastern end of the Bay Bridge. With the creation of the Emeryville Crescent State Marine Reserve in 1985 and increased attention to ecosystem preservation, the last mudflat sculptures were removed in 1997.

== Setting ==
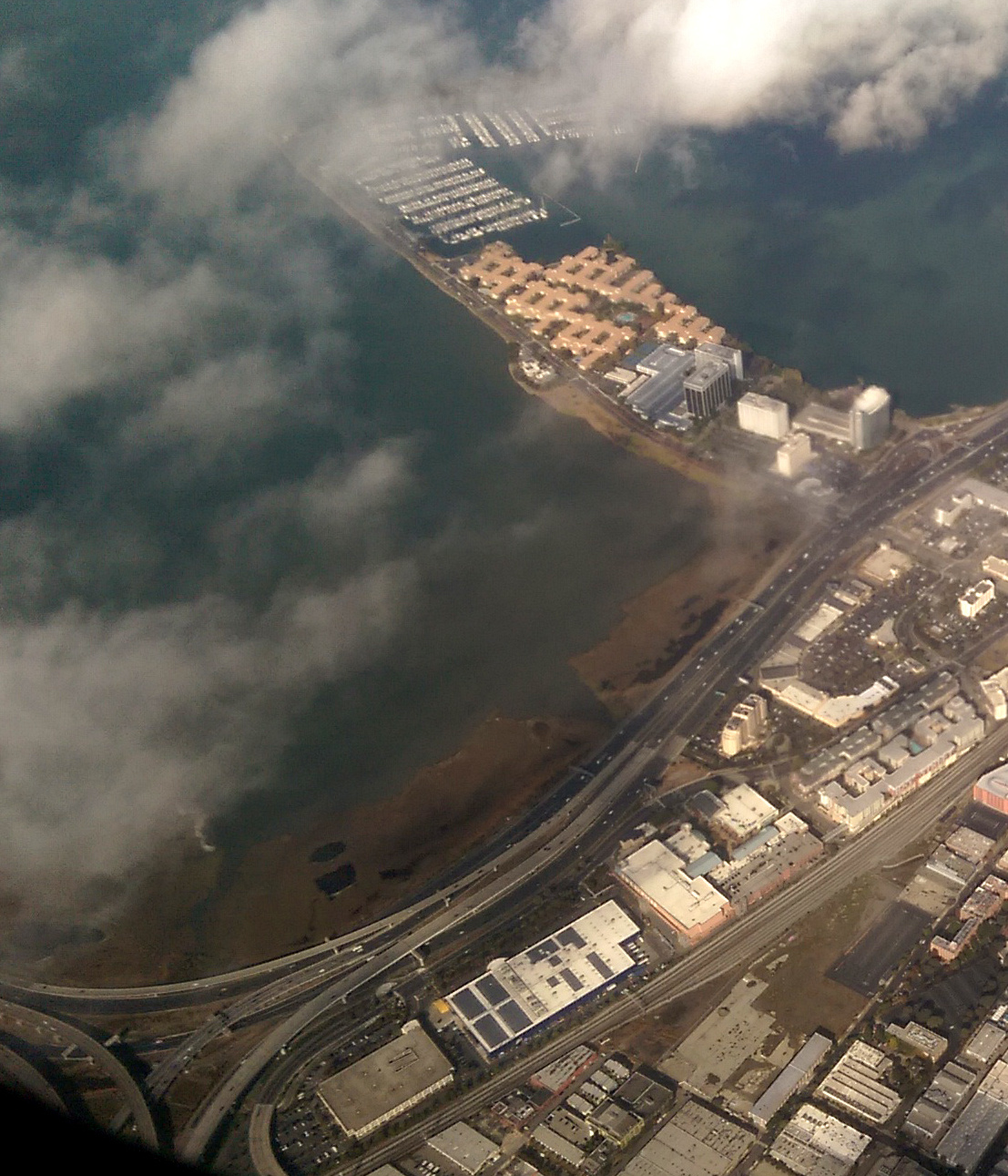
Aerial view of Emeryville bayfront (2016); the mudflats are just west of I-80, which runs north-south diagonally from lower left to upper right. The Emeryville Peninsula and Emeryville Marina extend west into San Francisco Bay, north of the mudflats.

The Emeryville mudflats are officially known as the Emeryville Crescent, lying west of the Eastshore Freeway (I-80), south of the Emeryville Peninsula, and north of the Bay Bridge toll plaza mole. They are bisected by the mouth of Temescal Creek. The Emeryville Crescent is a northern coastal salt marsh which supports cordgrass, pickleweed, eelgrass, and saltgrass; the endangered Ridgway's rail is known to reside in the Crescent.

During the early 20th century, debris from San Francisco Bay would frequently wash ashore at the mudflats, and industries based in Emeryville would often dump trash at the mudflats as well. Approximately 8.5 acres (3.4 ha) of the site are uplands (not inundated with tidal action), and 499 acres (202 ha) are tidelands or submerged. The uplands were created by filling existing marshlands with rubble from building demolition, steel mill slag, industrial waste, sand, and clay to a depth ranging from 5 to 20 feet (1.5 to 6.1 m). Fill activities at the site were completed by the mid-1960s.

== History ==
The genesis for the mudflat sculptures was an art class led by Professor Everett Turner at the California College of Arts and Crafts (CCAC) in 1960; as a collective project, the students built a large sculpture on nearby Bay Farm Island that summer. The students may have been inspired by Kurt Schwitters, whose Merz art (shortened from the German term for commerce, Kommerz) used leftover materials. The Bay Farm Island project was documented in photographs by Penny Dhaemers; when the photographs were shown at the Oakland campus of CCAC, they inspired student John McCracken to build his own sculptures in 1962 on the Emeryville mudflats. The mudflats had been used for duck hunting, and Anne Herbert speculated the first mudflat sculptures may have been inspired by hunting blinds.

In general, the sculptures were created by anonymous artists, characterized by their impermanence, and intended to be seen by freeway drivers. From the start, new sculptures were built from parts taken off older sculptures, leading to a constant cycle of building and rebuilding called "editing". Typically there were approximately 50 sculptures on the site at any given time, ranging in height up to 20 feet (6.1 m). SFSU art professor Alex Nicoloff called the collection "sculptural 'graffiti'" and characterized them as a revival of the Dada movement.

I'm really into this idea that people showed up in California, and they had this beautiful Italianesque landscape around them and they were like, 'You know what this needs? A giant artichoke! You know what this needs? A giant igloo in the desert!' Making your own world, by any means necessary, is really interesting to me.

— Joey Enos, Emeryville mudflat sculpture historian, quoted in Feb 22, 2018 Bay Curious article

High school student Wayne Saxton built his first sculptures at Emeryville in 1964; these gained national attention, with Time dubbing the art "derelict sculpture" in August. By 1965, multiple sculptures were being built by mostly amateur artists with no formal training.

A sculpture was built by August 1969 to commemorate the Moon landing. Other sculptures offered commentary on contemporary political issues, including the Vietnam War ("End War"/"Fuck War", early 1970s), the Salvadoran Civil War (1981), and United States funding wars in Central America (1987). An urban scarecrow competition was held for the 1985 San Francisco County Fair; the winner was to be moved to the Emeryville mudflats.

Robert Sommer declared the Emeryville mudflats were "the finest public sculpture gallery on the West Coast" in 1975. In 1977, the California Arts Council awarded a $4,393 grant to Richard Reynolds to purchase film for a documentary on the mudflat sculptures, which was published in 1980.

=== Site development ===
Meanwhile, the city of Emeryville had adopted a General Plan in 1966, calling for a significant expansion of Emeryville west of I-80 into San Francisco Bay on the Emeryville Peninsula, to be constructed on 400 acres (160 ha) of new fill along an extension of Powell Street; the "Tidelands" area created in western Emeryville would include waterways, lagoons, parks, new office spaces, and high density residential developments to attract businesses and residences. Development of the Emeryville Peninsula had been grandfathered by the city, whose planning commission had adopted the General Plan and approved permits just days before the McAteer-Petris Act of 1965 passed, creating the San Francisco Bay Conservation and Development Commission (BCDC) to review construction projects that would reclaim land from the Bay.

However, further development of the Emeryville Peninsula was halted by BCDC. In the early 1970s, the General Plan was revised to allow the Santa Fe Railroad to develop 60 acres (24 ha) of bayfront land north of the Emeryville Peninsula; in exchange, the Emeryville Crescent would be turned over to the city as open space. Santa Fe planned to bypass BCDC review by constructing on stilts rather than fill, but this loophole was not accepted by BCDC.

In May 1985, Santa Fe proposed to build two 18-story towers on new fill at the Crescent in exchange for turning over 81 acres (33 ha) to the public. At the first hearing to determine the scope of the environmental impact report/statement in August 1986, the deputy director of BCDC suggested the commission would not support Santa Fe's proposal. Despite a petition with more than half the residents of Emeryville opposing the development, the City Council took no action to bar development on the Crescent.

=== Decline ===
The Watergate Apartments were completed on the Emeryville Peninsula in 1971, and the high-rise Pacific Park Plaza just east of the Peninsula was completed in 1984, doubling the population of Emeryville. The influx of new residents and growing environmental awareness contributed to the decline of the mudflat sculptures through the 1980s. At this time, the city of Emeryville was aware of the mudflat sculptures and, along with BCDC, began to plan trails to afford better access to the site for artists, but the Golden Gate Audubon Society raised objections to those plans in 1978 and commissioned the Bodega Bay Institute to perform an environmental assessment of the Crescent. The report called the Crescent the "single most diverse wildlife habitat in the Bay" and identified significant impacts from continuing to allow human access to the site. In March 1980, Sylvia McLaughlin made the first presentation to the California State Parks Commission, proposing that a state park be created along the eastern shore of San Francisco Bay, from the Emeryville Crescent to the Hoffman Marsh.

By 1987, the snarl of driftwood was home to rats and feral cats, who were preying on the numerous species of shorebirds native to the Crescent. Other factors in the decline cited include the reconstruction of the freeway after the Loma Prieta earthquake of 1989, which reduced the visibility of the mudflats from traffic; vandalism and destruction of existing sculptures without reconstruction; the prevailing conservative political culture under the Reagan administration; and the creation of McLaughlin Eastshore State Park, encompassing the mudflats. The Crescent was sold to the state in 1994 for $3.2 million.

The last mudflat sculptures were hauled off the site in 1997. The site's owner, Catellus Development Corporation, remediated the site's industrial contamination, and turned it over to the California Department of Parks and Recreation, where it joined Eastshore State Park, which is managed by the East Bay Regional Park District.

== In media and inspirations ==
The mudflat sculptures are visited by the eponymous characters in one scene of the contemporaneous film Harold and Maude (1971), which was photographed in and around the Bay Area.

Kevin Evans, an early participant in the Burning Man art festival, cited the mudflat sculptures as an inspiration for moving the festival to the Black Rock Desert: "... setting art on the desert reminded me of these sculptures in the mudflats of Emeryville that I admired as a kid."

The Emeryville mudflat sculptures inspired a similar set of structures that were erected from the early 1970s to 1986 near Humboldt Bay, approximately 280 miles (450 km) north of San Francisco. The Humboldt Bay sculptures tended to be longer-lived than the Emeryville sculptures due to superior materials. Similar contemporary found art shoreline galleries went up around the San Francisco Bay Area, including the toll bridge plaza of the San Mateo–Hayward Bridge, the Bayshore Freeway interchange in Larkspur, in Redwood City, at the Albany Bulb, and in Rodeo.

In 2018, Ned Kahn and Pete Beeman were selected as finalists for artworks at the Emeryville Marina; like the earlier mudflat sculptures, the installations are intended to be visible from the eastern approach to the Bay Bridge. Kahn's proposal, entitled Wind Jetty, was approved by the City Council in September 2018. However, the permit application for Kahn's sculpture was rejected by BCDC on September 30, 2019, and Beeman indicated he was still interested in the commission, which he has tentatively titled Emeryville Serpent after a similar mudflat sculpture. The Emeryville Public Art Committee unanimously voted to not consider Beeman's proposal on February 13, 2020.

== Sculptors ==
Although the sculptures were generally uncredited, contemporary and current coverage and interviews have identified several sculptors who worked in the Emeryville mudflats:

- Sylvia Bennett
- Carol Bove
- Ron and Mary Bradden, Scarecrow in a Pumpkin Patch
- Colette Denton
- Scott Donahue
- Dan Fontes, Lunar Lander
- Tyler James Hoare, Red Baron and Snoopy
- Bob Kaminsky (and others), Summer Solstice Totem Pole
- Garry Knox
- John McCracken
- Charlie Milgrim
- Doug Minkler
- Tony Puccio, Mudflat Express
- Erik Rosenquist
- Wayne Saxton
- Walt Zucker
