= List of largest photographs =

The largest seamless photograph made in a single exposure was made using a Southern California jet hangar transformed into a giant camera. The most recent claim to the largest image stitched together was by the Canadian Museum of Civilization.

On August 3rd, 2015, the longest photographic negative was measured 79.37 m (260.4 ft) wide. This negative was created by Esteban Pastorino Díaz (Spain) by driving 32.8 km (20.4 mi) on the 2nd Ring Road (Beijing). Esteban Pastorino Díaz also holds the previous record, a negative measured 39.54 m (129.7 ft) wide. He used a custom-built panoramic slit camera on 13 June 2010. The negative is a panorama of major streets in Buenos Aires, Argentina, captured by the slit camera while mounted on the roof of a moving car.

== Largest seamless example ==
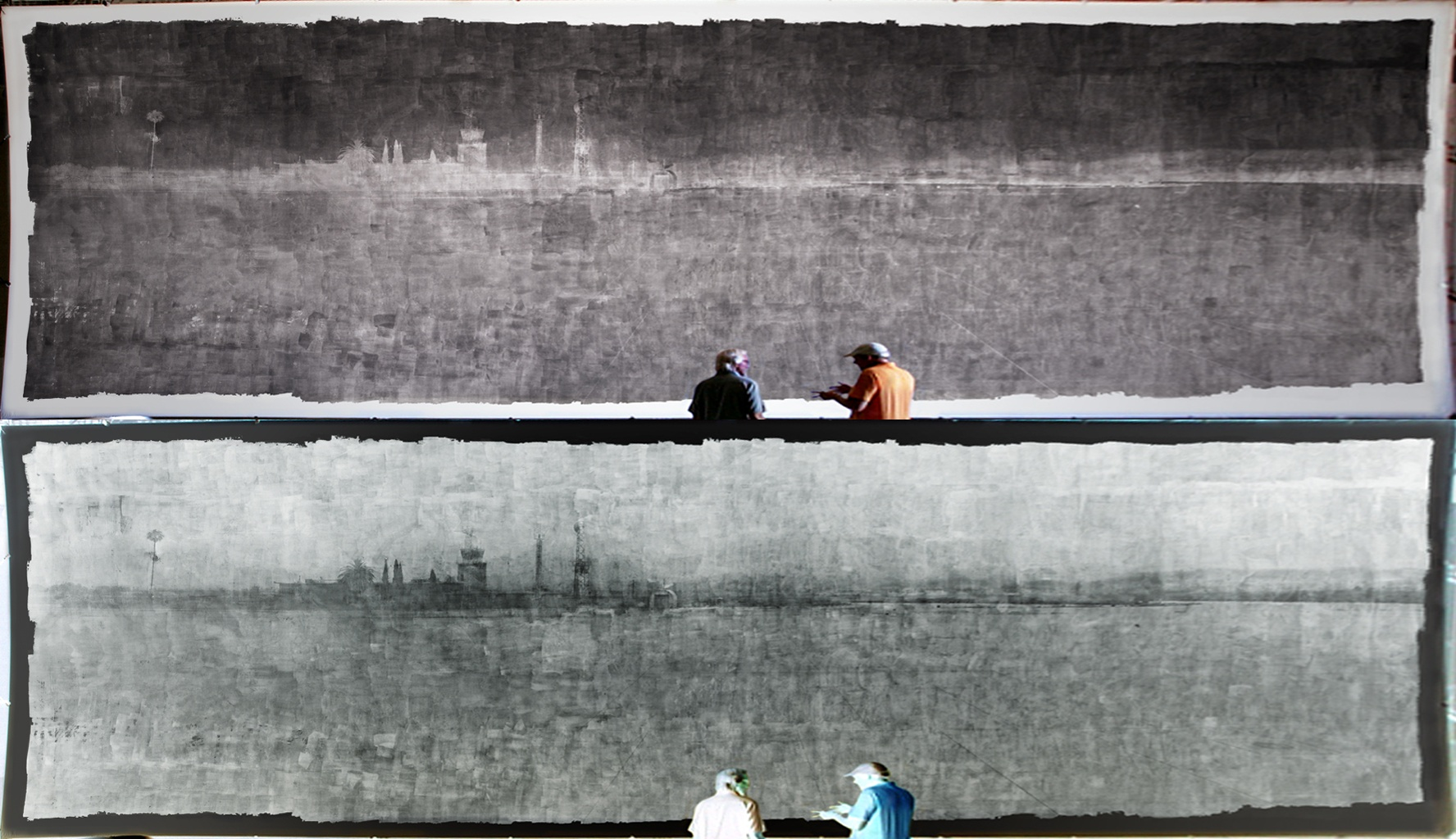
Orthorectified negative (bottom) and positive (top) representations of The Great Picture, partially obscured by two people.

- Name of project/picture: The Great Picture
- Claimed by: The Legacy Project; (Jerry Burchfield, Mark Chamberlain, Jacques Garnier, Rob Johnson, Douglas McCulloh, and Clayton Spada)
- Photograph of: control tower and runways at the U.S. Marine Corps Air Station El Toro, Orange County, California
- Dimensions: 32 feet (9.8 m) high × 111 feet (34 m) wide (9.75h × 33.83w meters). Aspect ratio is 3.47:1.

On July 12, 2006, six photographers (Jerry Burchfield, Mark Chamberlain, Jacques Garnier, Rob Johnson, Douglas McCulloh, and Clayton Spada) unveiled what is currently the world's largest camera and photograph.

The 3,552-square-foot (330.0 m^{2}) photograph was made to mark the end of 165 years of film/chemistry-based photography and the start of the age of digital photography. It was taken using a decommissioned Marine Corps jet hangar (Building #115 at El Toro) transformed into the world's largest camera to make the world's largest picture. The hangar-turned-camera recorded a panoramic image of what was on the other side of the door using the centuries-old principle of "camera obscura" or pinhole camera. An image of the former El Toro Marine Corps Air Station appeared upside down and flipped left to right on film after being projected through the tiny hole in the hangar's metal door. The "film" is a 32 by 111 feet (9.8 by 33.8 m) piece of white fabric covered in 20 U.S. gallons (76 liters) of light-sensitive emulsion as the "negative".

After exposing the fabric for 35 minutes, the image was developed by 80 volunteers using a giant custom-made tray of vinyl pool liner. Development employed 600 U.S. gallons (2,300 liters) of black-and-white developer solution and 1,200 U.S. gallons (4,500 liters) of fixer pumped into the tray by ten high volume pumps. Print washing used fire hoses connected to two fire hydrants.

== Largest example assembled from multiple pieces ==
- Name of project/picture: Unknown (Grand Hall diorama background)
- Claimed by: Canadian Museum of History
- Photograph of: Canadian Aboriginal forest
- Dimensions: 112 metres (367 feet) (W) × 15 metres (49 feet) (H)
- Photographers: Rob d'Estrube assisted by Dirk Heydemann of Destrube Photography of Victoria, B.C., Canada

The scene was originally produced on 6x6 cm transparency film shot with a Hasselblad 80mm lens in many overlapping sections. 80 rolls of film were used over several sites with this scene being finally chosen. The site is the estuary of Nasparti Bay at the base of the Brooks Peninsula on Vancouver Island, British Columbia. Shot in 1987 or 1988 to be ready for the opening of the museum in 1989. The installation is actually two scrims of identical size, one behind the other in mirror image to give the viewers a 3-dimensional experience while walking beside the diorama.

Within the Canadian Museum of History, one wall of the massive Grand Hall is composed of a scrim covered by a photo of a forest. The photo is about 100 by 15 m (328 by 49 ft).

== Digital photograph ==
The following are the digital photographs that have held the record for being the largest in terms of pixel count, beginning with the largest in chronological order (note: large digital images out of chronological order or lacking milestone significance are moved to acknowledgment section). Most instances are digital image mosaics obtained via image stitching for interactive visualization (VR photos).

=== Oslo from Holmenkollen 2 048 gigapixels (2025) ===
- Photograph of: Oslo, Norway
- Photographed from: Holmenkollen Ski Tower
- Year: photographed in 2023; published 2025
- Photographed by: Marek Rzewuski and August Rzewuski
- Total images: 366,843
- Pixels: 2,048,432,021,632
- Utilizing multi-frame super-resolution with sub-pixel alignment (registration) of up to 20 samples per image, applying optical flow correction, and performing median stacking.

https://holmenkollen360.com

=== Kuala Lumpur 846 gigapixels (2014) ===
- Photograph of: Kuala Lumpur, Malaysia
- Year: photographed in 2014; published 2015
- Achieved by: Lim Kok Wing and Limkokwing University of Creative Technology International
- Photographed by: The Team at Centre for Content Creation Sdn Bhd
- Pixels: 846,071,539,488
- The final image was the result of combining over 31,000 individual images in a panorama.

http://www.panaxity.com

=== Moon surface 681 gigapixels (2010-2013) ===
- Photograph of: The Moon's Northern polar region
- Taken from the Lunar Reconnaissance Orbiter Camera
- Year: taken over four years, from 2010 through 2013, published 2014
- composed from 10,581 images

Full size zoomable image

=== Prague from Old Town Square, 405 gigapixels (November 2018) ===
- Photograph of: Prague
- Claimed by: Jeffrey Martin
- Total images: 8,000
- Year: photographed in 2018; published in November 2018

http://360gigapixels.com/prague_gigapixel_panorama_900K_2018/

=== Calblanque, La Manga, Mar menor, and golf club 402 gigapixels (October 2015) ===
- Photograph of: Murcia Coast
- Claimed by: Carlos Caravaca Escavy (hawlok)
- taken from 336m Cabezo de la Fuente
- Dimensions: 1,335,000px × 300,913px
- Year: photographed in 2015; published in December 2015

=== Mont-Blanc 365 gigapixels (June 2015) ===
- Photograph of: Mont Blanc - Chamonix, France
- Claimed by: Filippo Blengini, Alessandra Bacchilega, Guido Bethaz, Matteo La Torre, Roland Clauss
- taken from 3500m up in the Vallee Blanche
- Year: photographed in 2014; published in June 2015
- composed from 70,000 images
- captured over 35 hours with one Canon EOS 70D camera mounted on a CLAUSS RODEON piXpert panoramic head.

Full size zoomable image

=== London 320 gigapixels (February 2013) ===
- Photograph of: London
- Claimed by: Joesph Michael James, Tom Mills, Holger Schulze
- Taken from the BT Tower
- Year: photographed in 2012; published in February 2013
- Composed from 48,640 images
- Captured over three days with four Canon EOS 7D cameras mounted on CLAUSS RODEON VR Head ST motorized mounts

Full size zoomable image

=== Electron Micrograph of a Zebrafish Embryo 281 Gigapixels (August 2012) ===
- Name of project/picture: Zebrafish Embryo 281 Gigapixels
- Claimed by: Frank G.A. Faas, et al.
- Photograph of: Zebrafish embryo
- Total images: 26,434
- Dimensions: 921,600px (W) × 380,928px (H). Each pixel represents 1.6 nm
- Pixels: 351,063,244,800
- Year: public availability: August 6, 2012

Full size zoomable image

=== Shanghai 272 Gigapixels (December 2010) ===
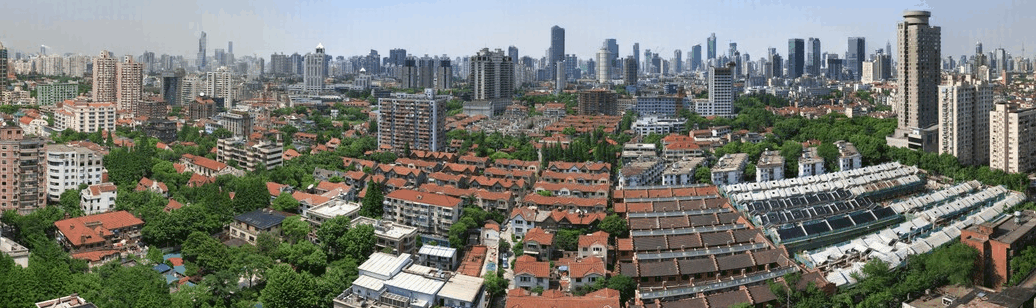
Shanghai Skyline

- Name of project/picture: Shanghai Skyline - Stitched From 12,000 Pictures
- Claimed by: Alfred Zhao
- Photograph of: Shanghai
- Pixels: 272,312,102,608
- Estimated optical pixels: 112 Gigapixels
- Dimensions: 887,276 (w) × 306,908 (h)
- Total images: 12000 (150 columns and 80 rows)
- Size: 1,089,248,410,452 bytes (1.09 TB)
- Year: shooting: May 25, 2010 / public availability: December 17, 2010

Full size zoomable image

=== Arcachon 228 Gigapixels (October 2015) ===
- Name of project/picture: Arcachon 228 Gigapixels Party / 333 Easter Eggs
- Claimed by: Ourco
- Photograph of: Bassin d'Arcachon - FRANCE
- Pixels: 228,511,957,990
- Total images: 14,700 in 6 hours (294 columns and 50 rows)
- Camera 20 Mpx 1200mm (eq 24×36)
- Year: shooting: June 4, 2015 / public availability: October 16, 2015

Full size zoomable image

=== Toruń 168 Gigapixels (November 2025) ===
- Name of project/picture: Toruń 168 Gigapixel Panorama Photo
- Claimed by: Marek Czarnecki, Jadwiga Czarnecka
- Photograph of: Toruń, Poland
- Dimensions: 1065000px (W) × 157808px (H)
- Pixels: 168,066,520,000
- Year: shooting: November, 2025 / public availability: February, 2026
- Full size zoomable image: Toruń zoom
- Project Web Page: Gigapikselowy Toruń
- Author's website about gigapixel panoramas: Gigapano

=== Pando Tree 164 Gigapixels (August 2021-Current) ===
- Name of project/picture: Pando Photographic Survey
- Claimed by: Friends of Pando
- Photograph of: Pando Tree, Fish Lake, Utah
- Pixels: 164,162,764,800
- Total images: 4,948 Image Locations In Sequence (52 Acres)
- Camera : Insta360 8K Camera. 33Mp Per Image
- Year: August 2021-Current
- Project Web Page: Explore Pando in 360°

=== Sevilla 111 Gigapixels (December 2010) ===
- Name of project/picture: Sevilla - 111 Gigapixels
- Claimed by: Jose Manuel Domínguez Pablo Pompa
- Photograph of: Seville
- Pixels: 111,173,273,248
- Total images: 9,750
- Year: shooting: September 29, 2010 / public availability: December 12, 2010

Full size zoomable image

=== Hamburg 100 Gigapixels (August 2015) ===
- Name of project/picture: Hamburg von oben - 100 Gigapixels
- Photograph of: Hamburg
- Claimed by: Holger Schulze
- Pixels: 100,000,000,000
- Year: shooting: 2015 / public availability: August 28, 2015

Full size zoomable image

=== Sugar Loaf 92 Gigapixels (September 2010) ===
- Name of project/picture: Sugar Loaf - 0.15 Terapix
- Claimed by: RioHK group
- Photograph of: Rio de Janeiro
- Pixels: 152,407,683,304
- Year: shooting: July 20, 2010 / public availability: September 28, 2010

Full size zoomable image

=== New York City from Empire State Building 80 Gigapixels (April 2021) ===
- Photograph of: New York City, United States
- Year: photographed in 2021; published in April 2021
- Photographed by: EarthCam
- Camera: GigapixelCam X80
- Pixels: 80,000,000,000

Full size zoomable image

=== London 80 Gigapixels (November 2010) ===
- Name of project/picture: London 80 gigapixels
- Claimed by: Jeffrey Martin
- Photograph of: London, United Kingdom
- Pixels: 80,000,000,000
- Year: shooting: June–August 2010 / public availability: November 16, 2010

=== Arches 77 Gigapixels (September 2010) ===
- Name of project/picture: Arches National Park - 77 Gigapixels
- Claimed by: Rongkai Zhao
- Photograph of: Arches National Park - Park Avenue Trail Head
- Pixels: 77,966,309,790
- Year: shooting: September 6, 2010 / public availability: September 18, 2010

Full size zoomable image

=== Budapest 70 Gigapixels (2010) ===
- Name of project/picture: 70 Billion Pixels Budapest
- Claimed by: 360systems Ltd.
- Photograph of: Budapest
- Photograph from: an observation tower on the highest point of Budapest
- Camera: two Sony A900 cameras with 400 mm Minolta lenses
- Pixels: 71,303,841,000
- Year: shooting: 2010

Full size zoomable image (requires Silverlight)

=== Corcovado 67 Gigapixels (July 2010) ===
(Not a cropped image: the sides of the picture are not straight. The real picture is smaller with the black parts on the edge.)

- Name of project/picture: Corcovado 67 Gigapixels
- Claimed by: RioHK group
- Photograph of: Rio de Janeiro
- Pixels: 67,821,473,740
- Year: shooting: July 8, 2010 / public availability: July 22, 2010

Full size zoomable image

=== Vienna 50 Gigapixels (July 2010) ===
- Name of project/picture: Vienna 50 Gigapixels
- Claimed by: Photoartkalmar
- Photograph of: Vienna
- Dimensions: 404864px (W) × 124832px (H)
- Pixels: 50,539,982,848
- Year: shooting: July 2010 / public availability: July 2010

Full size zoomable image

=== Marburg 47 Gigapixels (July 2010) ===
- Name of project/picture: Marburg 47 Gigapixels
- Claimed by: Peter Lauritis Photography
- Photograph of: Marburg, Germany
- Pixels: 47,676,298,005
- Year: shooting: July 2010 / public availability: July 20, 2010

Full size zoomable image

=== Dubai 45 Gigapixels (May 2010) ===
- Name of project/picture: Dubai 45 Gigapixels
- Claimed by: Gerald Donovan
- Photograph of: Dubai
- Dimensions: 472603px (W) × 94955px (H)
- Pixels: 44,876,017,865
- Year: shooting: April 23, 2010 / public availability: May 2, 2010

Full size zoomable image [Link not working]

Toruń 35 Gigapixels (August 2020)

- Name of project/picture: Toruń 35 Gigapixel Panorama Photo
- Claimed by: Marek Czarnecki, Jadwiga Czarnecka
- Photograph of: Toruń, Poland
- Dimensions: 300000px (W) × 117222px (H)
- Pixels: 35,166,000,000
- Year: shooting: August, 2020 / public availability: August, 2020

Full size zoomable image

=== Prague 34 Gigapixels (May 2013) ===
- Name of project/picture: Prague 34 Gigapixel Panorama Photo
- Claimed by: Jeffrey Martin
- Photograph of: Prague, Czech Republic
- Dimensions: 260000px (W) × 130000px (H)
- Pixels: 33,800,000,000
- Year: shooting: May, 2013 / public availability: May, 2013

Full size zoomable image

=== Swiss Alps 31 Gigapixels (April 2010) ===
- Name of project/picture: Swiss Alps 31 Gigapixels
- Claimed by: Simon Oberli
- Photograph of: Swiss Alps
- Dimensions: 385163px (W) × 80500px (H)
- Pixels: 31,005,621,500
- Year: shooting: March 13, 2010 / public availability: April 25, 2010

Full size zoomable image

=== Paris 26 Gigapixels (March 2010) ===
- Name of project/picture: Paris 26 Gigapixels
- Claimed by: Kolor Autopano / Arnaud Frich / Martin Loyer
- Photograph of: Paris, France and Lyon, France
- Dimensions: 354159px (W) × 75570px (H)
- Pixels: 26,763,795,630
- Year: shooting: September 2009 / public availability: March 2010

Full size zoomable image

Paris 26 Gigapixels is an interactive image showing a view of the French capital and its famous monuments, from the Eiffel Tower to the Pantheon. It was shot from the Church of Saint-Sulpice by photographer Arnaud Frich using a CLAUSS RODEON VR Head HD panoramic head and two Canon 5D Mark II DSLR cameras with 300mm f4.0 lenses and two 2x tele converter (equivalent 600mm f8.0). The 2346 images of the project were then assembled using Kolor Autopano Giga software. The website was created using several technologies: Kolor Autopano Tour, KRpano and Microsoft Research's HDview.

=== Gigapixel Dresden 26 gigapixels (2009) ===
- Name of project/picture: Gigapixel Dresden
- Claimed by: A.F.B. media GmbH / Sächsische Zeitung (local newspaper)
- Photograph from: Haus der Presse, Dresden, Germany
- Dimensions: 297,500px (W) × 87,500px (H)
- Size: 102 GB (raw data)
- Pixels: 26,031,250,000
- Year: 2009

Full size zoomable image

=== Prague 18 Gigapixels Spherical Panorama (December 2009) ===
- Name of project/picture: Prague from the TV Tower - 18 Gigapixel Panoramic Photo
- Claimed by: Jeffrey Martin
- Photograph of: Prague, Czech Republic
- Dimensions: 192,000px (W) × 96,000px (H)
- Size: 120GB (Photoshop file)
- Pixels: 18,432,000,000
- Year: shooting: October 2009 / public availability: December 2009

This image, when published in December 2009, was the largest fully spherical panoramic photo in the world. It is 192,000 pixels wide and 96,000 pixels tall. When printed, it is 16 meters (52 feet) long at regular photographic quality (300dpi). It was shot in early October 2009 from the top of the Zizkov TV Tower in Prague, Czech Republic in collaboration with Prague 3 town hall. Canon 5D MKII digital SLR camera and a 200mm lens were used. Hundreds of shots were shot over a few hours; these shots were then stitched together on a computer over the following few weeks.

=== Largest season image in the world - Ilmenau (Germany) 18 Gigapixel (2009) ===
- Name of project/picture: Largest season photo in the world
- Claimed by: Daniel Richter
- Photograph of: Ilmenau, Germany
- Dimensions: 142,736px (W) × 125,546px (H)
- Pixels: 17,919,933,856
- Year: 2009

Full size zoomable image

=== Yosemite-17-Gigapixels/Glacier Point (2008) ===
- Name of project/picture: Yosemite-17-Gigapixels/Glacier Point
- Claimed by: Gerard Maynard, New York, NY, USA
- Photograph from: Glacier Point, Yosemite National Park, California, US
- Dimensions: 214,414px (W) × 80,571px (H)
- Size: 96.5 GB
- Pixels: 17,275,550,394
- Year: 2008

Full size zoomable image

=== Udaipur 16 Gigapixel Image (2014) ===
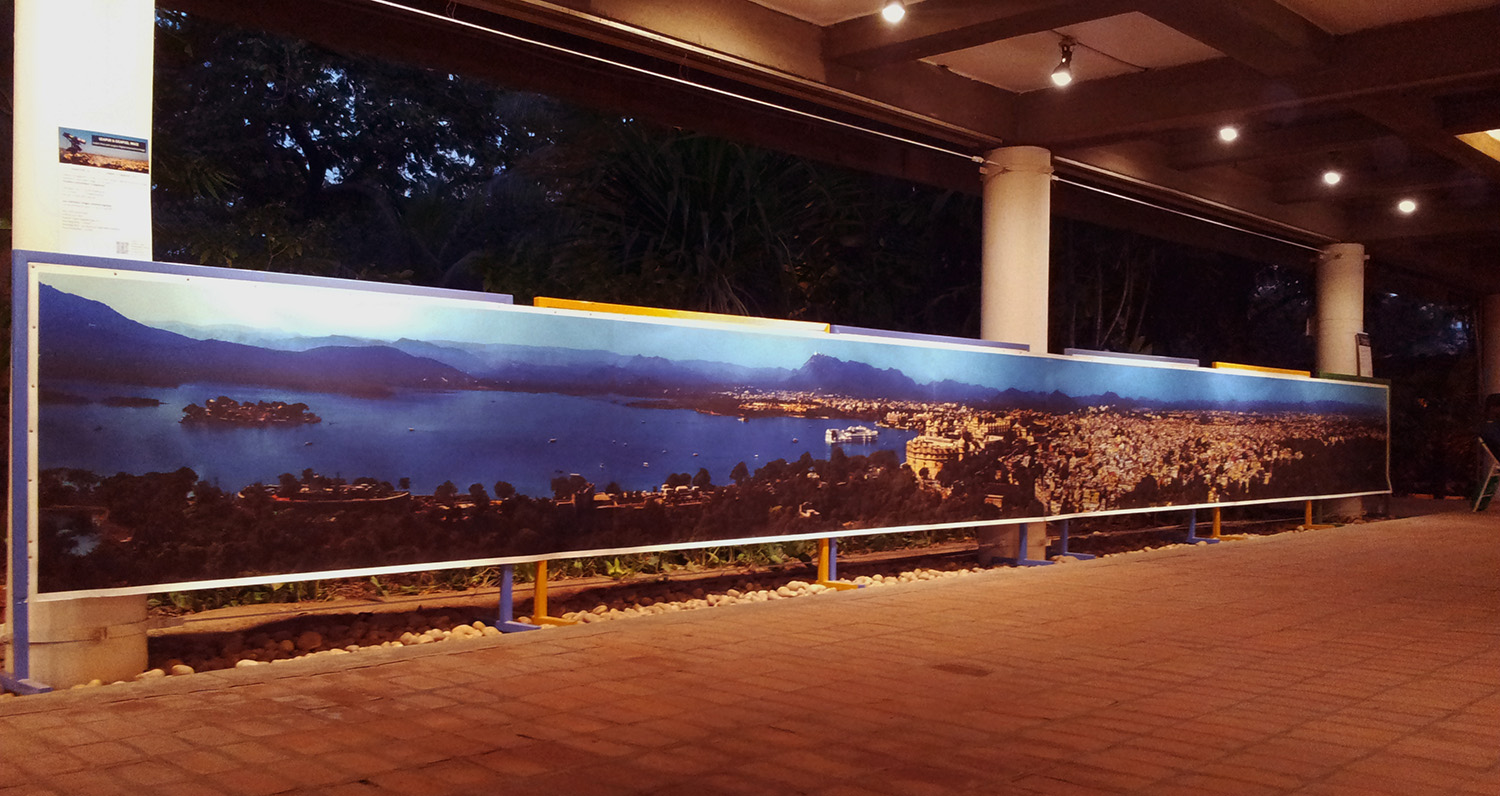
Udaipur Gigapixel image

- Name of project/picture: Udaipur 16 Gigapixel
- Photographed by: Pranshu Dubey (PixelDo.Com), India
- Photograph from: Karni Mata Temple, Udaipur, India
- Dimensions: 455,215px (W) × 36,894px (H)
- Size: 62.5 GB
- Pixels: 16,794,702,210
- Year: 2014

Full size zoomable image

This is the first gigapixel image of any Indian city and this is the first and largest digital interactive image in India. This image is a panorama of 1456 individual shots stitched together. Shot with Canon 550D and Canon 400mm 5.6 lens and robotic panoramic head. Anyone can access the website and experience an interactive tour of Udaipur.

=== The Last Supper (2007) ===
- Name of project/picture: The Last Supper
- Claimed by: HAL9000 Srl - Novara - Italy
- Photograph of: The Last Supper, as painted by Leonardo da Vinci, in the back halls of the dining hall at Santa Maria delle Grazie in Milan, Italy.
- Dimensions: 172,181px (W) × 93,611px (H)
- Size: 94.4 GB
- Pixels: 16,118,035,591
- Year: 2007

The 16.1 Gigapixel size was reached by HAL9000 Srl. The project "The Last Supper" was claimed to be the largest digital panoramic photo. It is a stitched photograph created merging 1677 shots from a single point into one photograph, each shot 12.2 Megapixel in size. Captured with a Nikon D2s Camera on a customized CLAUSS RODEON VR Head panoramic head.

Full size zoomable image

=== Harlem 13 Gigapixels (2007) ===
- Name of project/picture: Harlem 13 Gigapixels
- Claimed by: Gerard Maynard
- Photograph of: Harlem, New York
- Dimensions: 279,689px (W) × 46,901px (H)
- Size: 48.8 GB
- Pixels: 13,117,693,789
- Year: 2007

The 13 Gigapixel size was reached by Gerard Maynard. The 2,045 images were taken with a Nikon D2X with 300 mm lens mounted on a modified Peace River Studios PixOrb. The stitching and exporting was done automatically by Autopano Pro.

Full size zoomable image

=== Parete Gaudenziana (2006) ===
- Name of project/picture: Parete Gaudenziana
- Claimed by: HAL9000 Srl - Novara - Italy
- Photograph of: Parete Gaudenziana in Santa Maria delle Grazie Church in Varallo (Italy)
- Dimensions: 96,679px (W) × 89,000px (H)
- Size: 51.6 GB
- Pixels: 8,604,431,000
- Year: 2006

The 8.6 Gigapixel size was reached by HAL9000 Srl. The project Parete Gaudenziana was claimed to be the largest digital panoramic photo. It is a stitched photograph created by merging 1,145 shots from a single point into one photograph, each shot 12.2 Megapixel big.

=== Llandudno, North Wales, United Kingdom (2019) ===
- Name of project/picture: Llandudno, North Wales
- Claimed by: Peter Miko
- Photograph from: Cambridgeshire, United Kingdom
- Dimensions: 219,973px (W) × 35,847px (H)
- Size: 61.9 GB
- Pixels: 7,741,984,131
- Focal length: 560mm
- Year: 2019

The 7.74 Gigapixel size was reached by Peter Miko. The 798 images were taken with a Canon EOS-1D X Mark II and Canon EF 100-400mm f/4.5-5.6L IS II USM Lens + Canon Extender EF 1.4x III.

Full size zoomable image

=== Gigapix (2004) ===
- Name of project/picture: Gigapix
- Claimed by: TNO
- Photograph of: Delft, Netherlands
- Dimensions: 78,797px (W) × 31,565px (H)
- Size: 7.5GB
- Pixels: 2,487,227,305
- Year: 2004

The previous record belonged to Netherlands Organisation for Applied Scientific Research. One of these attempts was by Dutch company TNO. The project dubbed "Gigapix" was claimed to be the largest digital panoramic photo, although it is a stitched photograph by merging hundreds of small sections into one photograph. The photograph is 78,797 by 31,565 pixels large. It was taken on a Nikon D1X camera.

A preview of the image can be seen at:

- TNO Gigapix project description
- Full size zoomable

Gigapixel: Zug, Switzerland

Ralph Welling Gigapixel Images

welling.ch

Size 3.9 Gigapixel

September, 2017

=== Unknown title (2003) ===
- Name of project/picture: Unknown
- Claimed by: Max Lyons, Gigapixel Images
- Photograph of: Bryce Canyon, Utah, United States
- Dimensions: 40,784px (W) × 26,800px (H)
- Size: 2.06GB
- Pixels: 1,093,011,200
- Year: 2003

The previous record belonged to Max Lyons of Gigapixel Images. He had at one stage claimed to have created the largest photo. It consisted of 196 images that were stitched together. Since then, this claim has been surpassed by that of the TNO attempt. TNO's Gigapix is 2.5 times larger.

=== Portrait of a Coral Reef (1999) ===
- Name of project/picture: Portrait of a Coral Reef
- Claimed by: Jim Hellemn
- Photograph of: Bloody Bay Wall Coral Reef in Cayman Islands
- Dimensions: 76,934px (W) × 23,010px (H)
- Size: 4.95GB
- Pixels: 1,770,251,340
- Year: 1999

The previous record may have belonged to Jim Hellemn of Blue Ocean Art. In 1999, Hellemn created a 1.77 gigapixel underwater photocomposite image, which was designed to facilitate life-size reproduction of a 20 ft high by 70 ft wide section of Bloody Bay Wall, a vertical coral reef wall in the Cayman Islands. The image consisted of over 300 images that were manually stitched together from 4000ppi drum scans of Fuji Provia 100 transparency film. To make the image, a grid of 280 frames was photographed with 30% overlap to accurately cover the reef wall with full-spectrum light revealing the natural color and detail of the reef. Additional frames of marine life carefully photographed in the same grid composited in place to complete the scene. The on-site photography, requiring 23 dives and over 12 hours underwater to complete, was accomplished over a ten-day period by Jim Hellemn, with assistants Larry Hellemn and Peter Neubauer, using a neutrally-buoyant camera platform Hellemn designed specifically for the project. The post production of the image was completed in six months using multiple Macintosh G4 computers at Photographix in Poway, California, a digital graphics company owned by Hellemn.

A zoomable version of the image was made available to the public in 2000 using the ER Mapper's ECW (file format) and Image Web Server software on a site operated by Fugro-Pelagos, allowing visitors to explore the life-size image. The project and the techniques used by Hellemn inspired researchers at Miami University to use similar methods to produce wide-coverage video mosaics to study coral reefs. The image was published in the October 2001 issue of National Geographic Magazine, "Portrait of a Coral Reef".

== Large print of conventional sized photograph ==
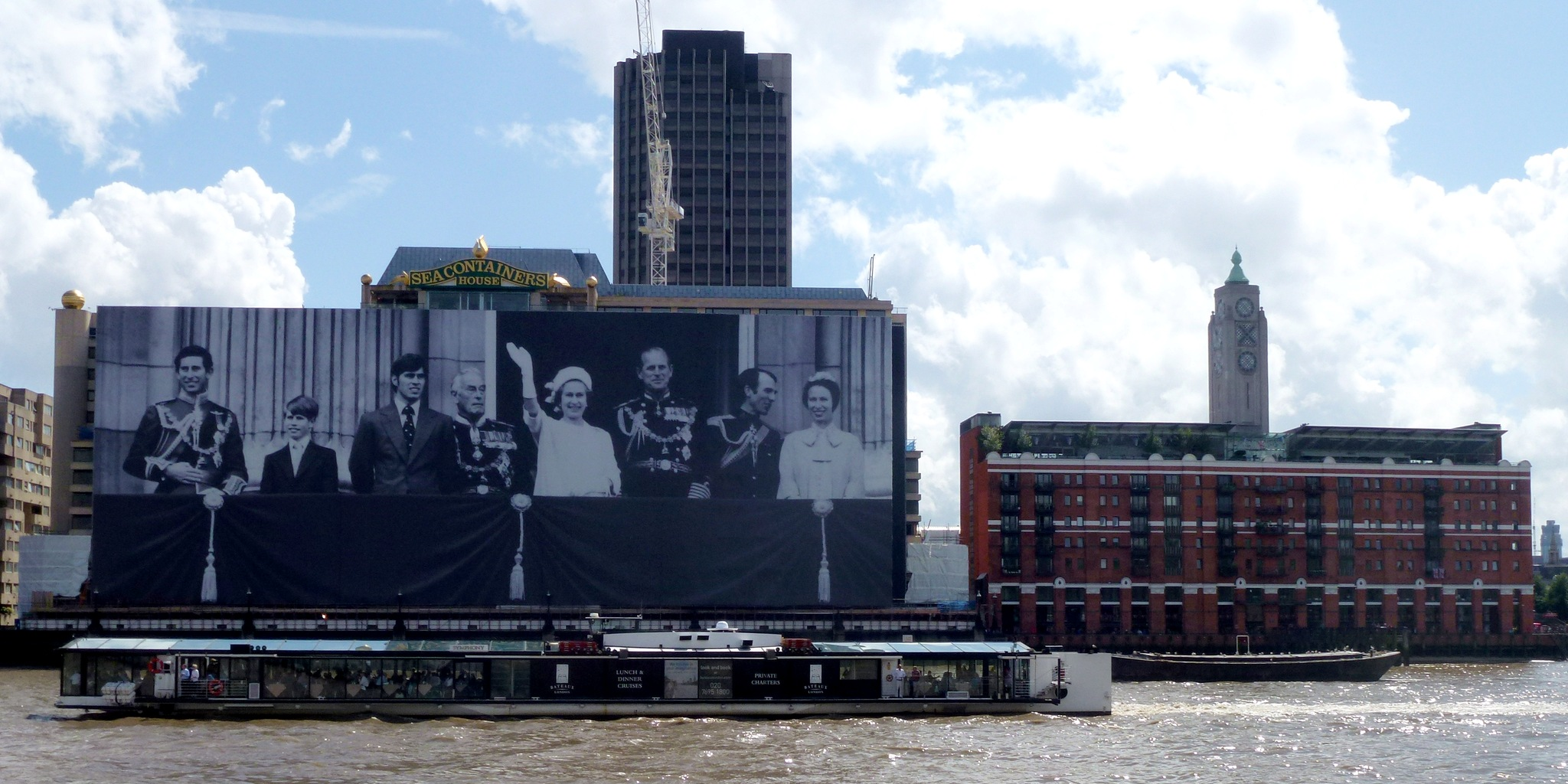
Sea Containers House decorated for Queen Elizabeth II's Diamond Jubilee.

For the Diamond Jubilee of Queen Elizabeth II, a 100 m × 70 m (330 ft × 230 ft) print of a photograph of the British royal family during her Silver Jubilee was erected in front of the Sea Containers House in London while the building was under renovation.

The 7,000 m^{2} (75,000 ft^{2}) photograph was produced by Service Graphics; it was erected over a period of eight weeks by Artel Scaffolding.

== See also ==
- Earth Platinum, 2012 atlas
- List of photographs considered the most important
