= Gordon Cheers =

Australian horticulturist

James Gordon Cheers (born 1954) owned a wholesale carnivorous plant nursery in southeast Australia. He went on to publish Carnivorous Plants (1983) and A Guide to Carnivorous Plants of the World (1993). This was followed by Killer Plants and How to Grow Them (1997) for Penguin Books as a Picture Puffin. The Picture Puffin book won the Children's Book of the Year Award: Eve Pownall Award for Information Books in Australia in 1997.

Gordon worked for Penguin Books and Random House and was the publishing director of children's and adult illustrated books, publishing Australia Through Time, Botanica, and many others. In August 1999, Gordon Cheers and Margaret Olds set up Global Book Publishing. Their first two titles, Anatomica and The Global Encyclopedia of Wine, appeared in 2000. Anatomica, with 912 pages, is likely the most comprehensive, illustrated body atlas since Gray's Anatomy. Wine extensively covers the world’s wine regions. In 2003, Gordon published, amongst others, Flora (1584 pages), which covers 20,000 plants and includes 12,000 colour images. It is the largest illustrated single volume plant encyclopedia ever published.

In 2005, with Margaret Olds, he established Millennium House to publish illustrated non-fiction books for both the Australian and the international market. Their titles include Astronomica, Historica, Geologica, Natural Health, Earth Concise, Earth Blue and the Earth Platinum. Millennium House was awarded Best Overall Atlas Award in June 2010, by the International Map Trade Association, giving Millennium House this award for the third year in row.

In 2026, he appeared as a contestant on Hard Quiz (Season 11, Episode 16). Carnivorous Plants was his expert subject.

== See also ==
- International Map Trade Association
- Children's Book Council of Australia
