= The Great Picture =

Largest print photograph (2011)

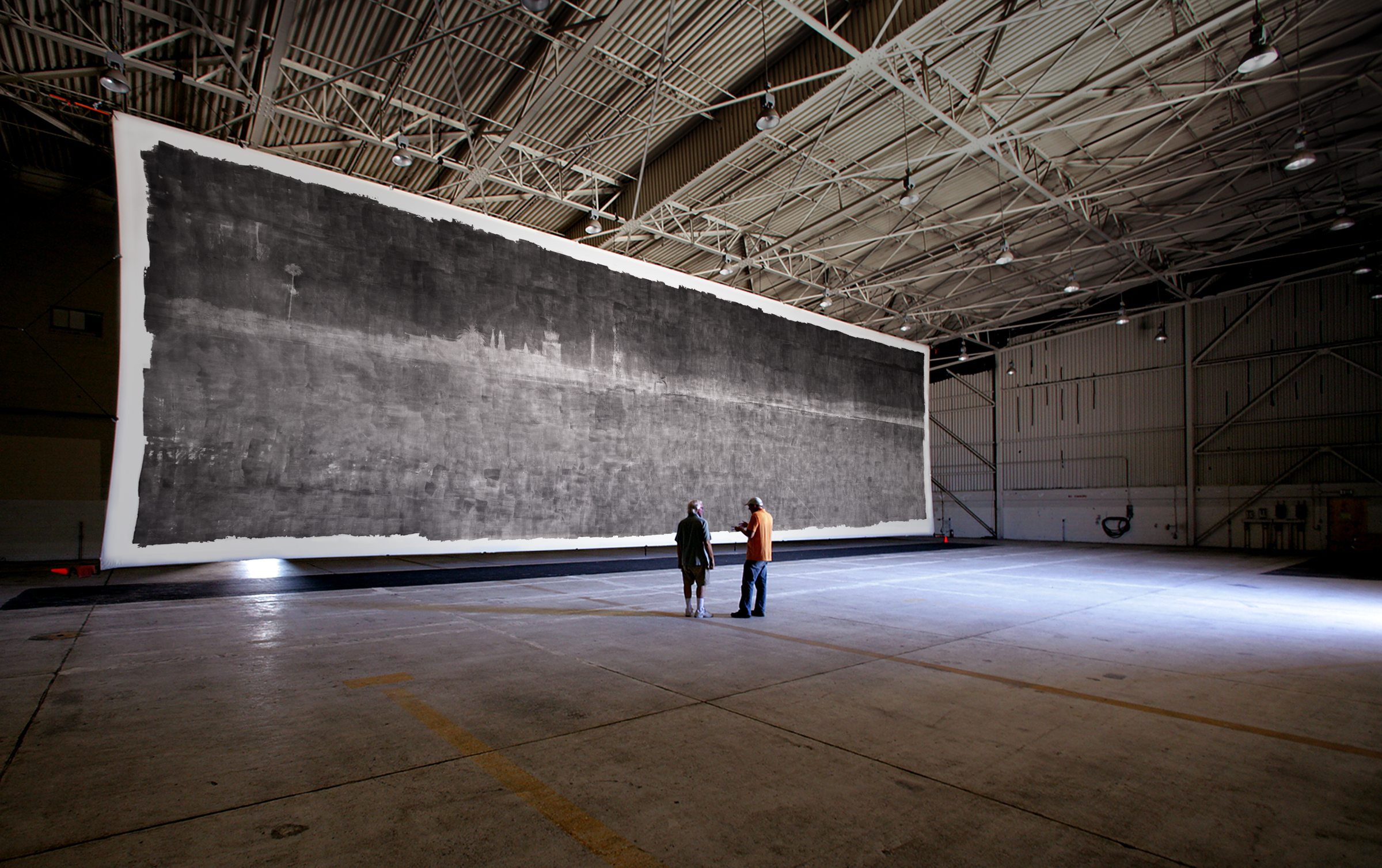
The Great Picture in its pinhole camera hangar.

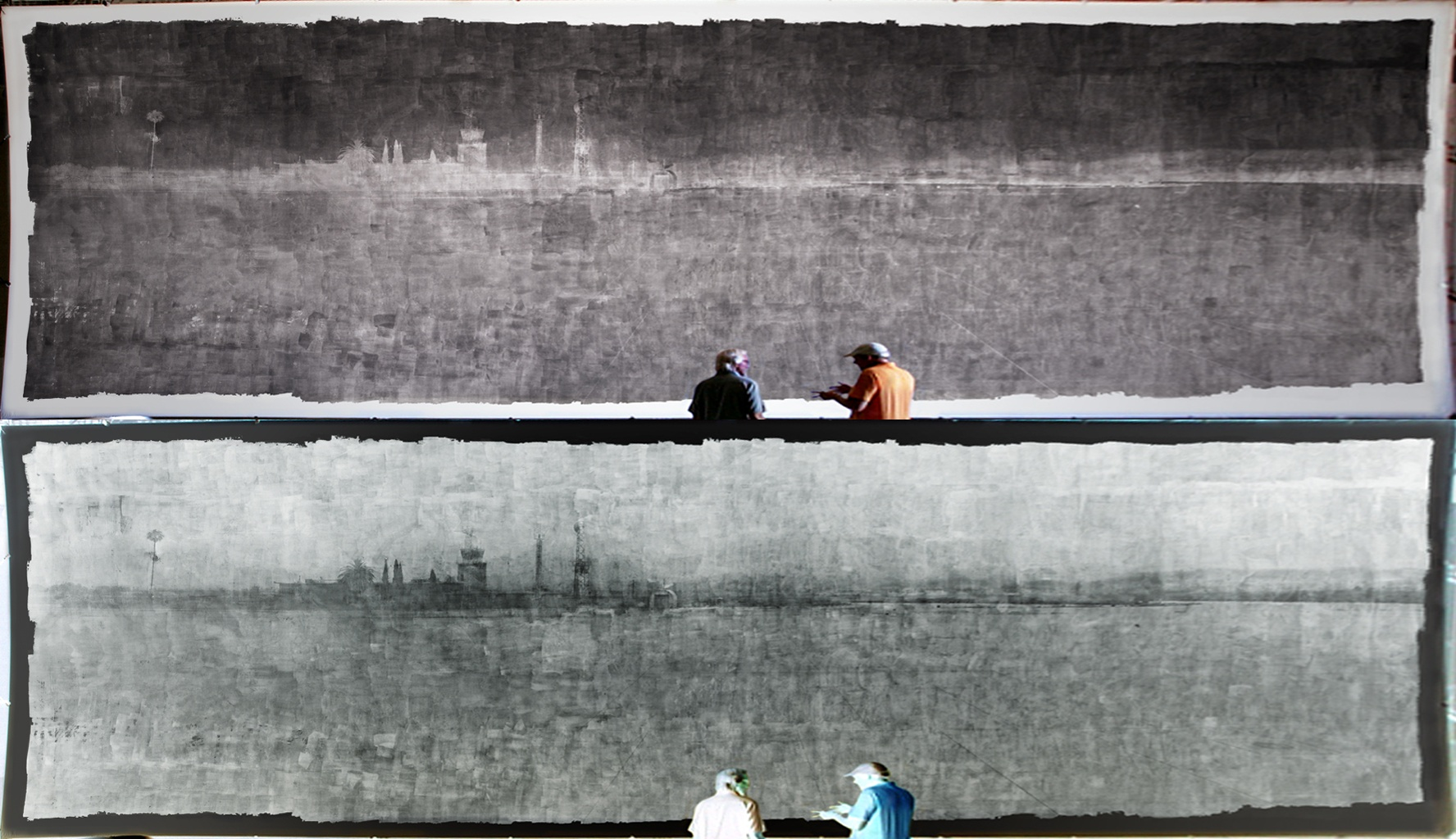
Orthorectified negative (top) and positive (bottom) representations of the photograph, partially obscured by two people.

As of 2011, The Great Picture (111 feet (34 m) wide and 32 feet (9.8 m) high) holds the Guinness World Record for the largest print photograph, and the camera with which it was made holds a record for being the world's largest. The photograph was taken in 2006 as part of the Legacy Project, a photographic compilation and record of the history of Marine Corps Air Station El Toro as it is being transformed into the Orange County Great Park. The project used the abandoned F-18 hangar #115 at the closed fighter base in Irvine, California, United States, as the world's largest pinhole camera. The aim was to make a black-and-white negative print of the Marine Corps air station with its control tower and runways, with the San Joaquin Hills in the background. The photograph was unveiled on July 12, 2006, during a reception held in the hangar and was exhibited for the first time at the Art Center College of Design in Pasadena, California, on September 6, 2007.

== Construction of the pinhole camera ==
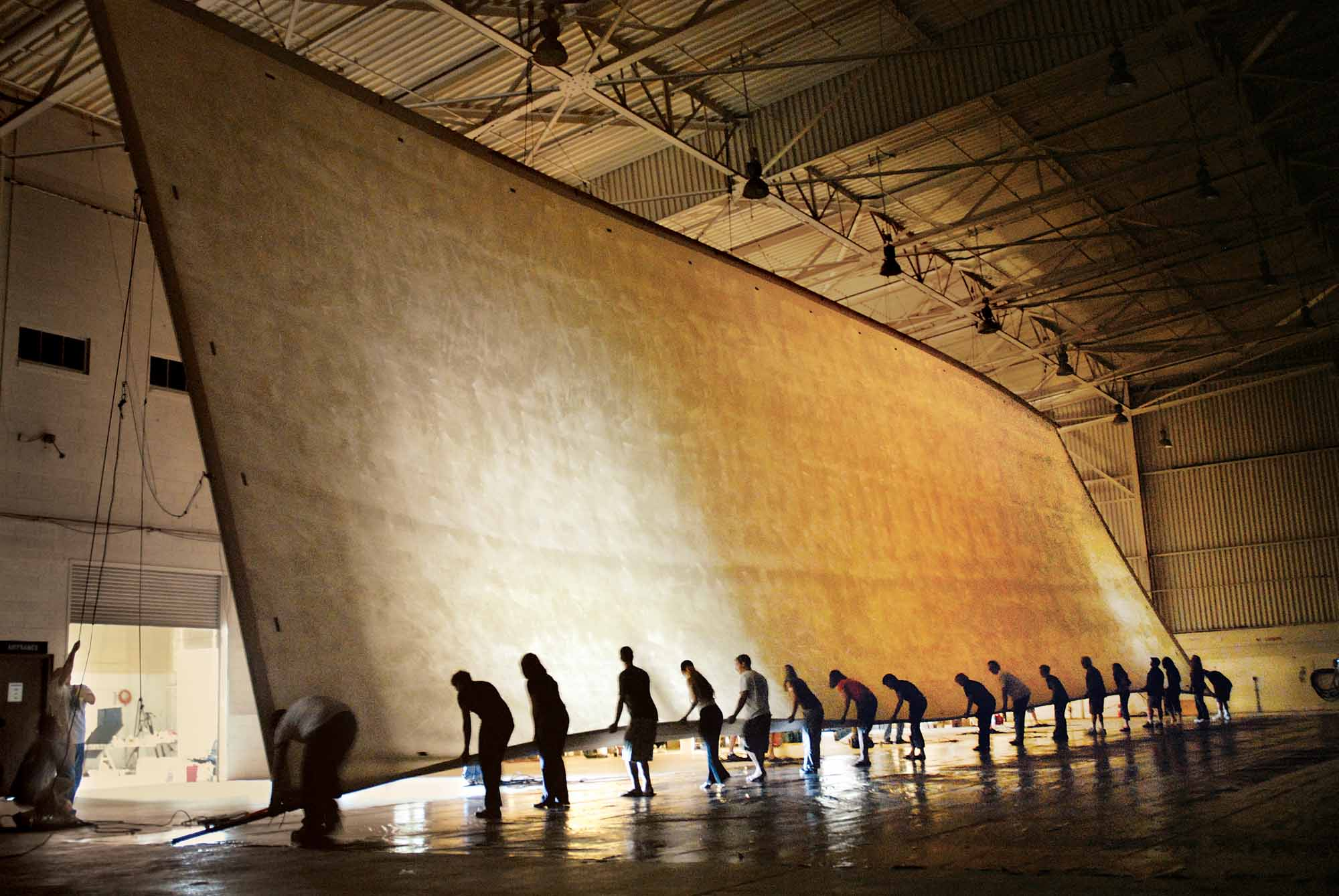
Volunteers lift the muslin cloth into place.

Six photographer artists, Jerry Burchfield, Mark Chamberlain, Jacques Garnier, Rob Johnson, Douglas McCulloh, and Clayton Spada plus approximately 400 assistants built the world's largest pinhole camera in building #115 at El Toro using 24,000 square feet (2,200 m^{2}) six mil black visqueen, 1,300 US gallons (4,900 L) of foam gap filler, 1.5 miles (2.4 km) of 2-inch (5.1 cm) wide black Gorilla Tape and 40 US gallons (150 L) of black spray paint to make the hangar light-tight. The camera measured 160 ft (48.76 m) wide x 45 ft (13.71 m) high x 80 ft (24.38 m) deep.

A seamless piece of muslin cloth was made light sensitive by coating it with 21 US gallons (80 L) of gelatin silver halide emulsion and then hung from the ceiling at a distance of about 80 feet (24 m) from a pinhole, just under 6 millimetres (0.24 in) in diameter and situated 15 feet (4.6 m) above ground level on the hangar's metal door. The distance between the pinhole and the cloth was determined to be 55 feet (17 m) for best coverage, and the exposure time was calculated at 35 minutes.

== Development ==
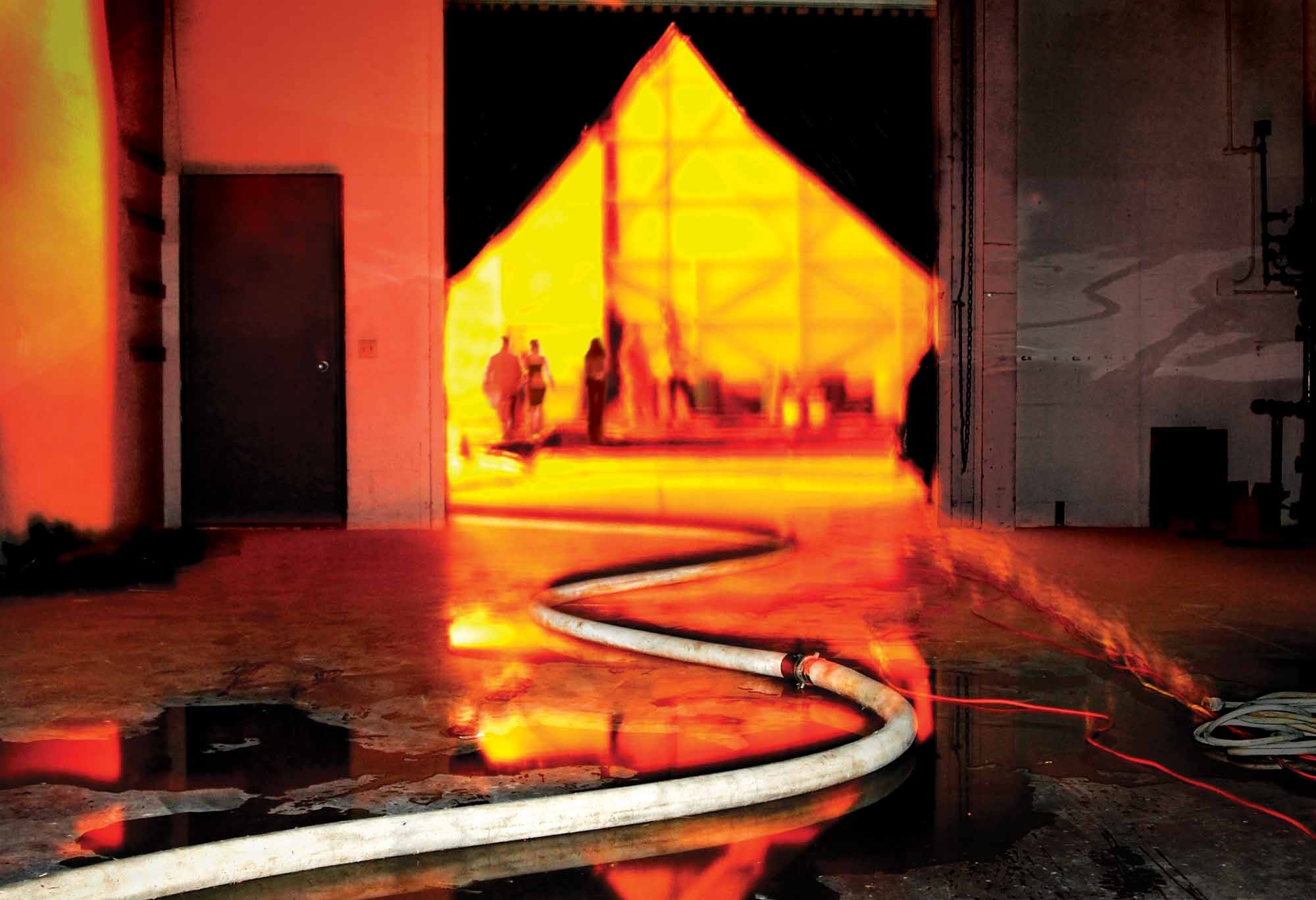
The Great Picture was washed using fire hydrants.

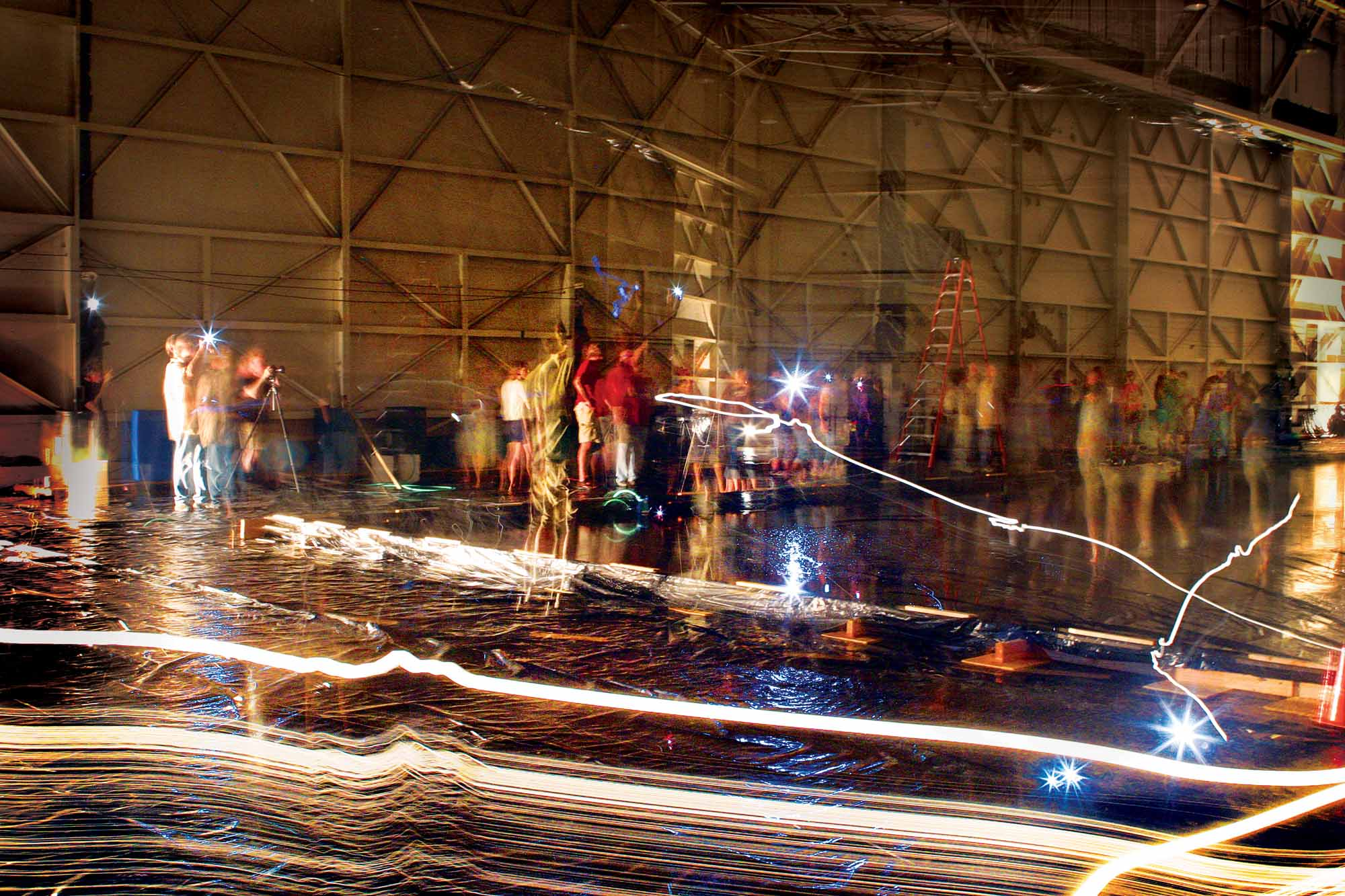
A long-exposure of The Great Picture being developed.

The hangar-turned-camera recorded a panoramic image of what was on the other side of the door using the centuries-old principle of "camera obscura" or pinhole camera. An image of the former El Toro Marine Corps Air Station appeared upside down and flipped left to right on film after being projected through the tiny hole in the hangar's metal door.

The opaque negative image print was developed by 80 volunteers during five hours in a vinyl pool liner custom tray, the size of an Olympic swimming pool, with 600 US gallons (2,300 L) of traditional developer and 1,200 US gallons (4,500 L) of fixer pumped into the tray using high volume pumps. The photograph was then washed using fire hoses attached to two fire hydrants. The finished print is 111 feet (34 m) wide and 32 feet (9.8 m) high with an area of 3,505.75 sq ft (325.695 m^{2}).

== Exhibitions ==
The Great Picture has been exhibited in the following venues:

- The Great Picture Unveiling on July 12, 2006, in hangar #115 (where it was taken) in Irvine, California.
- The Great Picture on September 6–29, 2007 at the Art Center College of Design in Pasadena, California.
- The Great Picture: The World's largest Photograph on March 8–27, 2011 at the Art Museum, Central Academy of Fine Arts in Beijing, China.
- The Great Picture: The World's largest Photograph & The Legacy Project on July 16 – October 8, 2011 at the Culver Center of the Arts and Sweeney Art Gallery/University of California, Riverside in Riverside, California.
- The Great Picture: The World's largest Photograph & The Legacy Project at the Contemporary Arts Center (New Orleans) on November 23 – December 15, 2013.
- The National Air and Space Museum of the Smithsonian Institution, April–November 2014.

== See also ==
- List of largest photographs
