= Penny Dhaemers =

American designer, artist (1926–2022)

- Born: Margaret Penrose Searing; 1926
- Died: July 26, 2022 (aged 95–96); Novato, California, US
- Other names: Margaret Dhaemers, Margaret Penrose "Penny" Dhaemers
- Education: California College of Arts & Crafts (BFA, MFA), Mills College (MA)
- Spouse: Robert Dhaemers (m.)

Margaret Penrose "Penny" Dhaemers (1926 – 2022; née Margaret Penrose Searing) was an American graphic designer, visual artist and educator. She was a professor in the University of California, Berkeley's College of Environmental Design (CED), specializing in graphic design, painting, and textile arts. She was the first woman to chair the Department of Design (1970–74) and following a reorganization in which it was absorbed into the CED, chaired the CED Visual Studies Committee from 1976 until her retirement in 1994.

== Personal life and education ==
Dhaemers received a BFA degree from the California College of Arts & Crafts (CCAC, now California College of the Arts); and graduate degrees in art history from Mills College (1967), and in painting and graphics from CCAC (1959).

She was married to fellow artist and jeweler Robert Dhaemers. Works created in the 1950s by both Penny and Robert are held by the San Francisco Arts Commission.

== Career ==
Dhaemers is known primarily for her photography. During her graduate studies, Dhaemers documented CCAC students working on the first found-object sculpture class on Bay Farm Island in 1960, which eventually grew into the Emeryville mudflat sculptures exhibited alongside the Eastshore Freeway until the early 1990s. In addition, Dhaemers photographed netsuke sculptures for the book Netsuke: A Guide for Collectors, first published in 1965.

In 2000, Dhaemers was one of the artists whose works were shown in the Videospace group exhibition at the Berkeley Art Museum and Pacific Film Archive. Videospace was drawn from the archives of the National Center for Experiments in Television, which was an artists' research center that operated between 1967 and 1975, affiliated with KQED, the local public television station. Dhaemers documented the artists and works being developed, using her Hasselblad still camera.

She also produced ceramic pieces.
