= Earth Platinum =

World's largest atlas

Earth Platinum, published by Millennium House in 2012, is the world's largest atlas at 6 ft × 4.5 ft (1.8 m × 1.4 m). It surpasses the famous Klencke Atlas at the British Library, which held the record of the world's largest atlas since 1660.

== The atlas ==
Earth Platinum weighs 150 kilograms (330 lb) and has 128 pages, each of which is so large it takes two hands (or people) to turn a page. The book is a mixture of maps and gigapixel photography. The maps include large orthographic maps of each continent (showing political and physical features), maps of the oceans, (including shipwreck locations) and poles, as well as very detailed regional maps. The book also includes a double-page 6 feet x 9 feet layout of the world's flags. Among its many spectacular images, Earth Platinum contains the world's largest image in a book, a photo of the Shanghai skyline. This image size is 272 gigapixels and made up of more than 12 thousand images tiled together.

Libraries which hold a copy of the atlas include the National Library of New Zealand, Wellington and the State Library of New South Wales, Sydney, Australia.

== Production ==
The atlas was conceived by Australian publisher Gordon Cheers and published in Australia, with the help of a team of over 88 cartographers from around the world. The atlas was printed in Italy and hand-bound in Hong Kong; the cartography was co-ordinated by a company in New Zealand.

Published 20 February 2012, Earth Platinum follows publication of the "smaller" Earth Blue and Earth Gold, both 2 ft x 18 inch, 30 kg, and both limited editions. Earth Platinum is priced at US$100,000; only 31 copies were printed.

== See also ==
- List of largest photographs
