= The Cartographic Journal =

Academic journal

- Discipline: Geography/Earth Sciences
- Language: English

Publication details
- History: 1964-present
- Publisher: Taylor & Francis on behalf of the British Cartographic Society (United Kingdom)
- Frequency: Quarterly
- Impact factor: 1.366 (2021)

Standard abbreviations
- ISO 4: Cartogr. J.

Indexing
- ISSN: 0008-7041 (print); 1743-2774 (web)
- OCLC no.: 856080388

Links
- Journal homepage; Journal homepage (British Cartographic Society); Online Submission Portal

The Cartographic Journal (first published June 1964) is an established peer-reviewed academic journal of record and comment that is published on behalf of the British Cartographic Society by Taylor & Francis. An official journal of the International Cartographic Association (ICA), it contains authoritative papers on all aspects of cartography: the art, science and technology of presenting, communicating and analysing spatial relationships by means of maps and other geographical representations of the Earth's surface. This includes coverage of related technologies where appropriate, for example, remote sensing and geographical information systems (GIS), the internet, satellite navigation and positioning systems, laser scanning, and terrain modelling. The Journal also publishes articles on social, political and historical aspects of cartography. Occasionally, Special Issues are published that focus on a particular research theme.

Its readership is drawn from over 180 countries and encompasses: academics and students; research and educational institutions, senior representatives of national mapping agencies; software suppliers and users; cartographic technicians; cartographic producers and publishers; oil exploration companies; librarians; designers; and other professional bodies and practitioners.

The Cartographic Journal is published quarterly and its one-year impact factor is 0.8 and five-year impact factor is 1.2 (2024). Its current editor-in-chief is Dr Alexander James Kent, honorary Reader in Cartography and Geographic Information Science at Canterbury Christ Church University.

Each year since 1975, the British Cartographic Society has run the Henry Johns Award (sponsored by cartographic firm Lovell Johns) for the most outstanding paper published in the preceding Volume (year). Nominations are submitted to the Editor by members of the international editorial board and the paper receiving the highest number is deemed the winner. The award (comprising £100 and a certificate) is usually presented to the author(s) at the Society's Annual Symposium.
