= Douglas McCulloh =

- Born: 1959; Los Angeles
- Died: January 5, 2025 (aged 64); Riverside, CA
- Occupation: Photographer

Douglas McCulloh (born in Los Angeles; 1959 – January 5, 2025) was an American photographer notable for conceptual photographic projects based on "systematic randomness" and chance operations. McCulloh's work is "an extension of the traditions of street photography, social documentary photography, oral history and Surrealist chance operations", states photo historian Jonathan Green. "As such, it is grounded in some of the century's most powerful conceptual currents." McCulloh was one of six photographers who in 2006 transformed an F-18 jet hangar into the world's largest camera to make The Great Picture, the world's largest photograph. McCulloh also curated exhibitions, most notably Sight Unseen: International Photography by Blind Artists, the first major museum exhibition of work by blind photographers. McCulloh, under the nom-de-plume "Quoteman", also collected and posted online thousands of quotations about photography.

== Life ==
McCulloh held B.A. degrees from the University of California, Santa Barbara in renaissance history and sociology and an M.F.A. from Claremont Graduate University in photography and digital media. McCulloh wrote that his "mother is a refugee and my father is a geologist." Because of an upbringing that highlighted both uncontrollable change and deep time, McCulloh stated he "has believed since childhood that the world operates mainly by chance."

McCulloh died unexpectedly on January 5, 2025, just before his latest exhibition opened.

== Career ==
McCulloh's art is conceptual in character, using chance systems to drive large photographic projects. He was clear about the goal: "Chance liberates us from the limitations of our intention", McCulloh writes. "Chance subverts control, allowing art to become an opening into the world's full complexity." "Everybody feels like they have control over things", McCulloh told interviewer Marilyn Thomsen in 2003, "but I think the world mostly operates by strange chance. If the world operates by chance, why not use [chance] as a way of encountering the world directly?" In 2009, McCulloh summarized his methods: "I create systems driven by chance operations: random sampling, chance drawings, map transects. Then I set the systems in motion and record what chance provides." Art critic Christopher Miles positioned McCulloh's strategy within art history: "In order to take both his own preconceptions and popular constructions out of the picture, Douglas McCulloh has done something clever and simple. McCulloh merely merged the tradition of social documentary photography á la Robert Frank with the Surrealist approach of creating a system that forces the artist to act at the mercy of chance."

== Major works ==
=== Chance Encounters (1992-2002) ===
Chance Encounters is a photographic sampling project controlled by a map gridded into 5,151 quarter-mile squares that encompass all of urban Los Angeles County. McCulloh begins each day of photography by pulling chance coordinates that select one random quarter-mile square, according to a book on the project. McCulloh then travels to that quarter-mile square with a single camera and 18mm wide angle lens, speaking "with almost everyone he encounters" and making more than 20,000 photographs. "McCulloh's working method avoids pitfalls by adopting the Dadaist strategy of leaving things to chance", stated Los Angeles Times art critic William Wilson. "He selects areas at random, spending a day shooting whatever he finds – beach, slum or riverbed slime. A traveling exhibition of Chance Encounters was curated by California Museum of Photography director Jonathan Green.

=== On the Beach (2000-2007) ===
With a high resolution camera and studio lighting, McCulloh and collaborator Jacques Garnier made photographs on beaches in California and Florida over a seven-year period. "Beaches are half display, half voyeurism", stated the Southeast Museum of Photography about the project. "This is the precise terrain of photography – one side posing, the other looking. Cameras belong on the beach." The photographers set up studio lighting at crowded beaches and "sample the passing parade like scientists who periodically dip water out of a flowing stream." The resulting photographs are "infinitely less guarded than posed portraits", states arts writer Laura Stewart. "They tell vivid stories about the beach and its people, and about those of us who are given the unusual freedom to stare." Kevin Miller, director of the Southeast Museum of Photography in Daytona Beach, Florida, originated an exhibition and book on the project. The work has also been shown at museums including the Laguna Art Museum, Autry National Center of the American West, and California Museum of Photography.

=== 20,000 Portraits (2001) ===
McCulloh and collaborator Ted Fisher led 68 artists, photographers, and volunteers in a project that photographed 20,558 visitors to the Los Angeles County Fair. A short documentary about the project reveals the working methodology – four digital shooting stations built into the fair's fine art pavilion; one image of each person is made and a database created with subject's answers to five questions: first name, age, gender, and zip code, and "What makes you unique?" 20,000 Portraits was in the vanguard of database-driven art projects and has been shown widely, most prominently in the LA Freewaves 2002 New Media Biennial in Los Angeles.

=== The Legacy Project (2002-continuing) ===
The Legacy Project is a 15-year art project focused on a major closed United States military base: Marine Corps Air Station El Toro in Orange County, California. As of September 2007, the six photographers – Jerry Burchfield, Mark Chamberlain, Jacques Garnier, Rob Johnson, Douglas McCulloh, and Clayton Spada – had made more than 90,000 photographs, according to reports published by arts writer Liz Goldner. For 50 years, the 4,700-acre El Toro base was at the heart of Marine Corps air operations, playing pivotal roles in World War II, Korea, Vietnam, and the first Gulf War. In an extensive essay, art critic and curator Mark Johnstone, equates the ambitious scope and scale of the Legacy Project to other major photographic surveys, specifically the geographic surveys of the American West in the 1800s, the Historical Section of the Farm Security Administration (1935–1942), and the National Endowment for the Arts Surveys (1976–1981). Legacy Project work has been shown in many exhibitions, including Laguna Art Museum, Chapman University, Art Center College of Design, Cypress College, Orange Coast College, and the City of Los Angeles Angels Gate Cultural Center.

=== Dream Street (2003-2009) ===
McCulloh won the right to name a street in Southern California at a charity auction. He then spent hundreds of hours at the place he named "Dream Street", producing 12,891 photos, 47 1/2 hours of recordings, three bankers' boxes of notes, maps and e-mails" and ultimately a book. The 134-home, 40-acre subdivision is a microcosm of the new economy, a site where issues of race and gender, immigration and exploitation, hopes and dreams animate a classic California landscape. Susan Brenneman, writing in the Los Angeles Times, called Dream Street "a classic tale, recast for Southern California: the American dream, tied to the almighty dollar and abundant cheap labor, dependent, equally, on self-deception and inextinguishable hope." "For those of us who live on one of California's streets of dreams", writes author D.J. Waldie "the history of how this one was made is of enormous importance as a warning and a guide."

=== 60,000 Photographs in Hollywood (2003-continuing) ===
McCulloh was given a commission to document Hollywood in 60,000 photographs by the City of Los Angeles' L.A. Neighborhoods Project. "The result," states photographer and writer Aline Smithson, "is a massive and multi-layered artistic inquiry. Map-driven and infused with data and first-hand narrative, the project moves beyond traditions of the isolated photographic image. Instead the project emphasizes complexity, multiplicity, extreme volume, and the interplay of image, data, map, and text." McCulloh's Hollywood work has been exhibited in the U.S. and Europe and has become part of the permanent photo archive of the City of Los Angeles.

=== The Great Picture (2006) ===
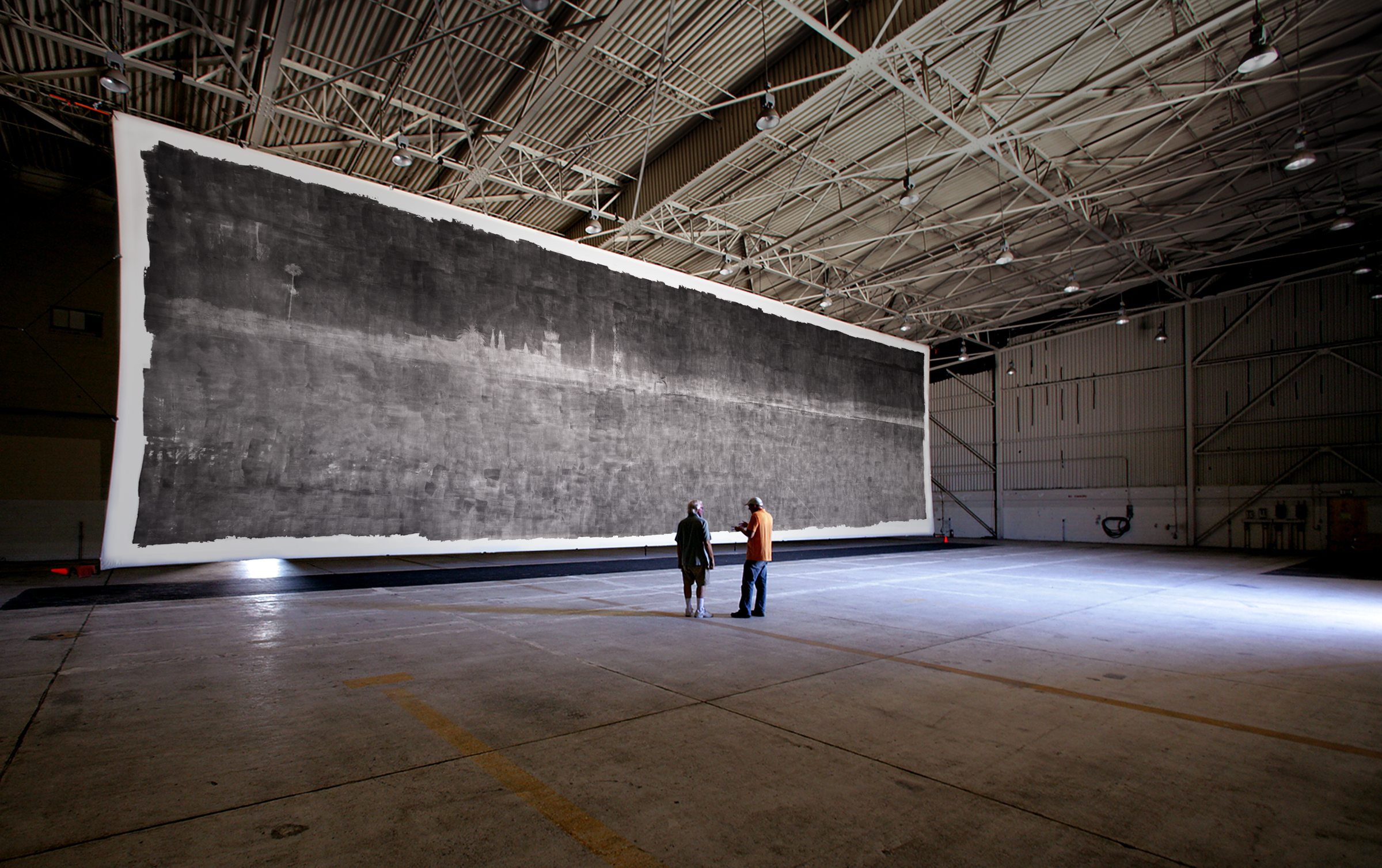
The Great Picture hanging in its hangar-camera.

The Great Picture is the largest photograph ever made as a single seamless image, produced on July 8, 2006, using a Southern California jet hangar transformed into a giant camera. The 3,505.75 square-foot (325.44 m^{2}) photograph was made to mark the end of 165 years of film/chemistry-based photography and the start of the age of digital photography. It was made by The Legacy Group; (Jerry Burchfield, Mark Chamberlain, Jacques Garnier, Rob Johnson, Douglas McCulloh, and Clayton Spada). Dimensions of the photograph are 31 feet 7 inches (9.63 meters) high x 111 feet (34 meters) wide. Aspect ratio is 3.47:1. The photograph is of the control tower and runways at the U.S. Marine Corps Air Station El Toro, Orange County, California. The exposure was 35 minutes long and development took 5 hours, 70 people and 1,800 U.S. gallons (6,800 liters) of black-and-white chemistry. The Great Picture has been written about in more than 500 publications, states art writer Liz Goldner, including Art in America, Photographie.com, AfterImage, Juxtapoz, Black and White, Los Angeles Times, and Chicago Tribune.

=== Sight Unseen (2009-continuing) ===
McCulloh was curator of Sight Unseen: International Photography by Blind Artists for the UCR/California Museum of Photography. Los Angeles Times art critic Christopher Knight stated that the "87 works by 11 artists and one collective" are "more akin to Conceptual art than to traditional camera-work." Artists included in Sight Unseen are Ralph Baker, Evgen Bavčar, Henry Butler, Pete Eckert, Bruce Hall, Annie Hesse, Rosita McKenzie, Gerardo Nigenda, Michael Richard, Seeing With Photography Collective, Kurt Weston, and Alice Wingwall. Sight Unseen was shown at UCR/California Museum of Photography from May 2 to August 29, 2009, and has since traveled to the Kennedy Center for the Arts in Washington, D.C.; Centro de la Imagen, Mexico City; and Flacon, Moscow. The exhibition is the first major museum exhibition of blind photographers, states Stacy Davies in ArtSlant. Writing for Time magazine, Matt Kettman quotes McCulloh on the conceptual underpinning of the work: "The whole trajectory of modern art for the last 100 years has been toward the concept of art as mental construction, and blind photography comes from that place. They're creating that image in their head first — really elaborate, fully realized visions — and then bringing some version of that vision into the world for the rest of us to see."

== Published works ==
- McCulloh, Douglas (2009). Dream Street. 176 pages; 114 duotone plates. Berkeley, California: Heyday Books. ISBN 978-1-59714-103-1.
- McCulloh, Douglas; Garnier, Jacques (2006). On the Beach: Chance Portraits From Two Shores. 152 pages; 68 color plates. Daytona Beach, Florida: Southeast Museum of Photography/Daytona Beach Community College. ISBN 978-0-9789072-0-4.
- The Legacy Group (2005). The Edge of Air: Photographs of the Final Days of the Marine Corps Air Station at El Toro. 96 pages; 50 color plates. Laguna Beach, California: Laguna Wilderness Press. ISBN 978-0-9728544-5-0.
- McCulloh, Douglas (1998). Chance Encounters: The L.A. Project. 218 pages; 94 quadtone plates. Riverside, California: University of California/California Museum of Photography. ISBN 978-0-9666936-0-7.
