= British Cartographic Society =

- Founded: 28 September 1963
- Type: Learned Society and Registered Charity
- Registration no.: 240034
- Purpose: Promoting the Art and Science of Mapmaking
- Location: Portsmouth, England
- Coordinates: 50.805833°N 1.087222°W
- Region served: The United Kingdom of England, Wales, Scotland and Northern Ireland
- Key people: President: Mr Paul Naylor; Vice President: Mr Christopher Budas
- Revenue: £72,189 (year ending June 2010)
- Website: www.cartography.org.uk

The British Cartographic Society (BCS) is a registered charity dedicated to exploring and developing the world of maps. Membership includes national mapping agencies, publishers, designers, academics, researchers, map curators, individual cartographers, GIS specialists and ordinary members of the public with an interest in maps.

The BCS is regarded as one of the world's leading cartographic societies and its main publication, The Cartographic Journal, is recognised internationally.

== Objectives ==
The BCS promotes all aspects of cartography to a wide range of potential users. The BCS is affiliated to the International Cartographic Association and represents the UK internationally. BCS members play an active part in the development of mapping throughout the world.

The Society has Memoranda of Understanding with several other organisations active in fields related to cartography.

== Membership ==
The Society offers membership in various categories:

- Fellow
- Full
- Student
- Affiliate
- Corporate
- Small Corporate
- Educational

From time to time, the society confers Honorary Fellowship status on those who have, in its view, rendered distinguished service to the Society.

== History ==
In the years following the Second World War, good mapping was clearly needed to underpin postwar recovery. In many countries, existing societies relating to geography provided the channels to assist with these efforts. In the UK, it became clear that a more focused approach would be helpful.

On 28 September 1963 at a formal meeting chaired by Brigadier D.E.O. Thackwell (then Vice President of the ICA), the formation of the Cartographic Society was proposed. With further contributions from the Institution of Professional Civil Servants, the aims of the new Society were agreed and Brigadier Thackwell was elected as the first president.

Since then, the Society has become firmly established both nationally and internationally and has developed to meet the challenges of new technology such as GIS.

== Initiatives and Events ==
The Society holds not-for-profit events open to the public and any interested parties to help raise the profile of cartography in the UK and to facilitate the exchange of information and ideas amongst members of the Society and others. These initiatives also aim to advance cartographic education and encourage research.

The Society's flagship event is its annual conference (Symposium) which brings together members and those working in the industry to network and discuss good practice and developments in the field.

== Geoviz ==
In 2021, as a successor to its Better Mapping programme, the Society launched GeoViz – a new programme of activity that supports and nurtures cartography, map making and geographic data visualisation. It is designed to provide useful and informative content through a range of online material, events and more. The Better Mapping initiative was a series of seminars that ran throughout the UK between 2006 and 2019 and aimed to provide technical know-how to those just starting to create their own maps from the vast array of available spatial data and to get the best (cartographically) from general-purpose tools.

== Online Events ==
During the national lockdowns imposed during the COVID pandemic, the Society increased the amount of online provision, both with the availability of static material on its website and also through webinars and other online fora.

== Restless Earth ==
The Society supports cartographic education through its Restless Earth programme which brings awareness of mapping into schools through an interactive problem-solving workshop based on natural hazards as featured in the National Curriculum, currently the Japanese earthquake and tsunami of 2011.

== Special Interest Groups ==
Throughout its existence, the Society has included many special interest groups focussing on particular elements of the cartographic spectrum. As of 2021, the following are active:

- Historical Military Mapping Group (HMMG):
- Map Curators' Group (MCG)

== Awards ==
One of the aims of the Society is to encourage better mapping by providing prizes and awards to individuals or companies who have shown excellence in this field. The annual BCS awards includes categories such as:

- The Peter Jolly Award for the best map or geographic data visualisation (in paper or digital form)
- The Stanfords Award for printed mapping
- The Collins Bartholomew (formerly John C. Bartholomew) Award for thematic mapping
- The Ordnance Survey Student Award
- The Garsdale Design Award for 3D cartography
- The BCS Award for digital mapping
- The Ian Mumford Award for excellence in cartographic research undertaken by a student
- The Children's Map Competition supported by Dennis Maps

Additionally, from time to time the Society awards its Medal for a distinguished contribution to cartography.

Previously, the Esri UK New Mapmaker Award (formerly the National Geographic Award) was awarded, for excellence in scholarship or cartographic work, to those starting out in cartographic or associated industries.

New Mapmaker Award Winners:

- 2001: Laura Stewart, University of Edinburgh Can Geographical Information Systems be used to Propose Areas for Storage of Floodwater?
- 2002: Edward Merritt, Oxford Brookes University An Assessment of the Effectiveness of Paraline Diagrams for Mapping the Urban Environment
- 2003: Esme Farewell, Oxford Brookes University Cambridge for Children
- 2004: Donna Watkin, Oxford Brookes University Modern cartographic methods as a key to understanding land use in Drayton St Leonards: 1793–2003
- 2005: Shannon Brassard, Centre of Geographic Sciences, Nova Scotia Community College, CanadaPrince Albert: Celebrating 100 Years
- 2006: Paul A Light, COGS, Canada National Parks & Historic Sites of Western Newfoundland and Labrador
- 2007: Alexander Kent, Canterbury Christ Church University An Analysis of the Cartographic Language of European State Topographic Maps: Aesthetics, Style, and Identity
- 2008: Wesley Jones, NSCC Centre of Geographic Sciences, Canada Dry Belt, Settlement and Abandonment of Southeast Alberta and Southwest Saskatchewan, 1908 to 1926
- 2009: Christoph Hoesli, Institute of Geography at the University of Bern, Switzerland Southern Sudan Topographic Base Map Series: Map Sheet E – Eastern Equatorial
- 2010: Michael Graves, Kingston University Road to the World Cup South Africa 2010
- 2011: Mike Wilburn, University of Oregon, USA Mount Rainier: A Climber's Paradise

== Publications ==
In order to further its aims, the Society publishes books and periodicals:

- Cartography – an introduction (a practical guide to making better maps)
- A Celebration of 50 years of the British Cartographic Society (published by the Society to mark its 50th anniversary in 2013)
- The Cartographic Journal – the official peer-reviewed periodical of the Society and one of the most widely respected journals in this field
- Maplines – the Society's popular magazine, free to all members, and containing news, views and short articles about maps and mapmaking
- Cartographiti – the newsletter of the Map Curators' Group

== Resources ==
The Society makes several online directories available, allowing both Corporate Members and freelance cartographers to publicise their work. These include:

- Map Curators Toolbox – an online resource supported by the Map Curators' Group
- Directory of UK Map Collections – an online resource detailing major map collections in the UK

== See also ==
- Geographical Association
- Remote Sensing and Photogrammetry Society
- Royal Geographical Society
- International Cartographic Association
- International Map Industry Association
