= International Map Industry Association =

Cartography organization

The International Map Industry Association (IMIA), formerly known as the International Map Trade Association (IMTA), is the foremost worldwide organization of the mapping, geospatial and geographic information industry. In 2018 IMIA reorganized into a single global organization, based in the United States, with one board of directors. Previously the organization had three divisions that operated separately: the Americas Division covering North, Central, and South America; the Europe/Africa/Middle East division (EAME); and the Asia-Pacific Division.

Each year IMIA, in cooperation with its members and affiliate organizations, conducts in-person and virtual events, and attends conferences and trade shows throughout the world. Annual IMIA-hosted events include the Mapping Leaders Forum, Where Cartography Meets Industry, Points of Interest, and a collective stand at the Frankfurt Book Fair.

Affiliate organizations are like-minded cartographic or geospatial focused entities that have signed agreements to affiliate and participate with IMIA in various ways including co-promotion of membership and event content. Current IMIA affiliate organizations include the British Cartographic Society (BCS), the Cartography and Geographic Information Society (CaGIS), the International Cartographic Association (ICA), and the Open Geospatial Consortium (OGC).

== See also ==
- International Cartographic Association
- North American Cartographic Information Society
