= Mitzi Waltz =

Scholar of disability and media studies

- Born: Mitzi; 1962 (age 63–64)
- Education: Vrije Universiteit Amsterdam
- Alma mater: San Francisco State University University of Sunderland
- Occupation: Lecturer Researcher
- Employer: University of Birmingham
- Known for: Autism, Mass communication
- Website: https://research.vu.nl/en/persons/71d435c7-8f3a-4726-9541-76abcbb557d2

Mitzi Waltz (born 1962) is a scholar of media and disability studies. As of 2020, she is a research associate at Vrije Universiteit Amsterdam.

Waltz was formerly an associate lecturer in autism studies at the Autism Centre of Sheffield Hallam University in the United Kingdom. Before her appointment in 2012, she was a lecturer in autism studies at the Autism Centre for Education and Research (ACER), University of Birmingham and a senior lecturer at the University of Sunderland.

== Publications ==
- Waltz, Mitzi (2005). Alternative and Activist Media. Edinburgh University Press. ISBN 978-0-7486-1957-3. JSTOR 10.3366/j.ctt1g0b3wz.
- Waltz, Mitzi (2013). Autism: A Social and Medical History. Palgrave Macmillan. ISBN 978-1-137-32853-3. OCLC 832378570.
