= The Tenderloin Times =

The Tenderloin Times was a free monthly newspaper serving the Tenderloin district of San Francisco, published from the 1970s to the 1990s, with a circulation of 15,000. Its pages were filled with news on homelessness, social programs affecting the area's residents, immigration, neighborhood history and other topics. Its investigative reports on issues such as the death of homeless people on San Francisco streets and the high rate of pedestrians hit by cars in the neighborhood were often picked up by mainstream media. Founded by homeless people and the directors of Hospitality House's drop-in center, one of the paper's core policies was to distribute information about medical, financial, housing, and job-seeking services for people who lived in the neighborhood.

One page was devoted to poetry written by Tenderloin residents and participants in a weekly writing workshop held at Hospitality House in the neighborhood. The writing in the paper was praised by Pulitzer Prize–winning columnist Herb Caen of the San Francisco Chronicle, and was profiled positively in the New York Times, the Los Angeles Times, the San Francisco Examiner and Columbia Journalism Review.

Starting in 1985, the paper was published in four languages: English, Lao, Khmer and Vietnamese - reflecting the ethnic diversity of the neighborhood's residents. Rob Waters, later a freelance journalist and a reporter for Bloomberg News, and Sara Colm, now a senior researcher at Human Rights Watch, worked as editors.
