= Mark Monmonier bibliography =

Geographer Mark Monmonier's publications

Mark Stephen Monmonier bibliography
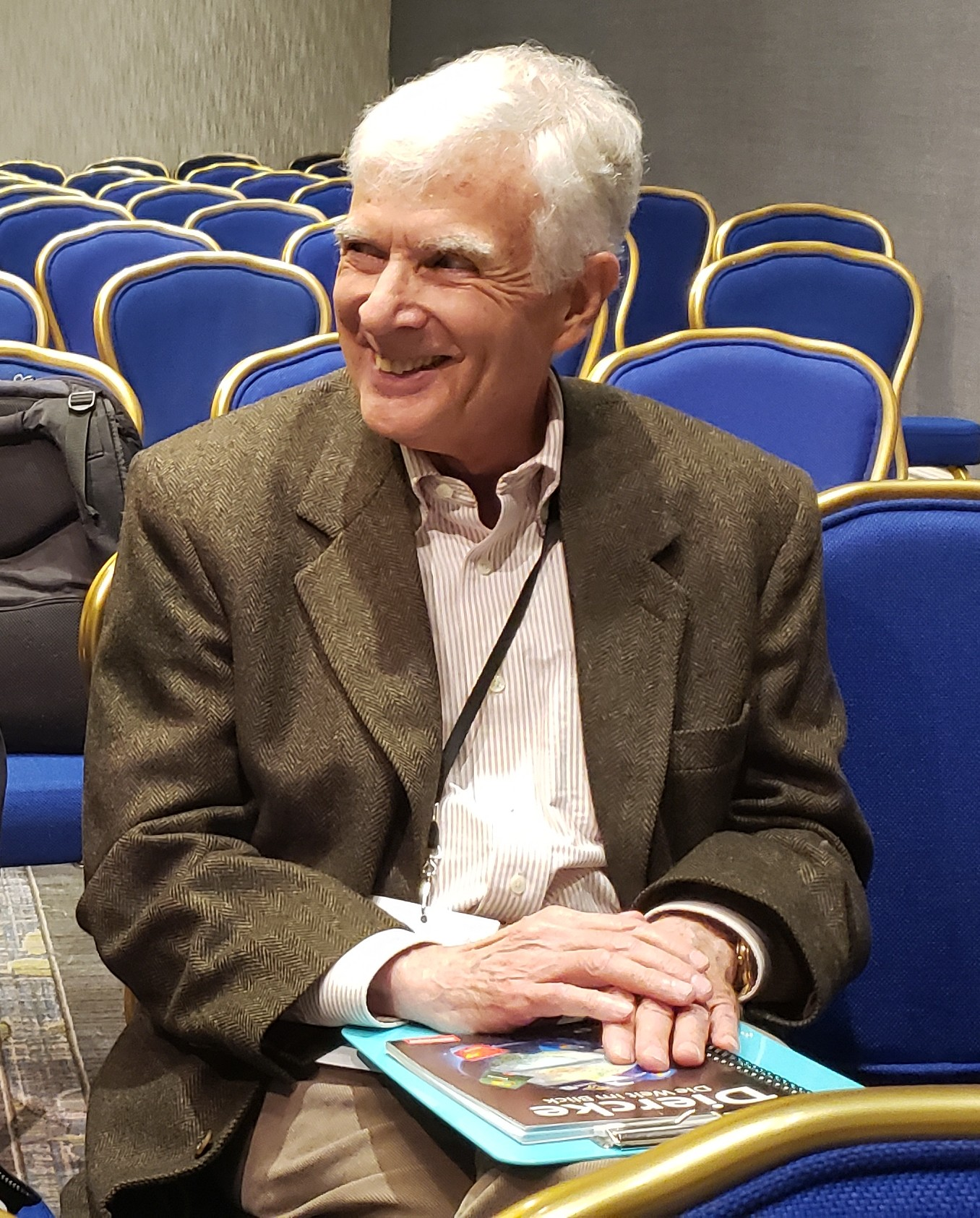
- Mark Monmonier at American Association of Geographers 2019 annual conference

Mark Monmonier (born February 2, 1943) is a geographer with a long track record of publications that have been influential to the discipline. In 2023, the American Association of Geographers awarded Monmonier a lifetime achievement award, with prominent mention of his publication track record, specifically stating, "Monmonier’s works are timeless and have transformed how people see, analyze, and interact with maps." Monmonier stands out from other academics in that he published several books aimed at the general population. His most famous book, How to Lie with Maps has been referred to as the "bible for cartographers" by Steven Bernard of the Financial Times and "the closest thing to a religious text we have in cartography" in Spatial Literacy in Public Health: Faculty-Librarian Teaching Collaborations. His publication Maximum-Difference Barriers : An Alternative Numerical Regiodization Method lead to what is now referred to as the "Monmonier Algorithm."

== Books ==
=== Single author books ===
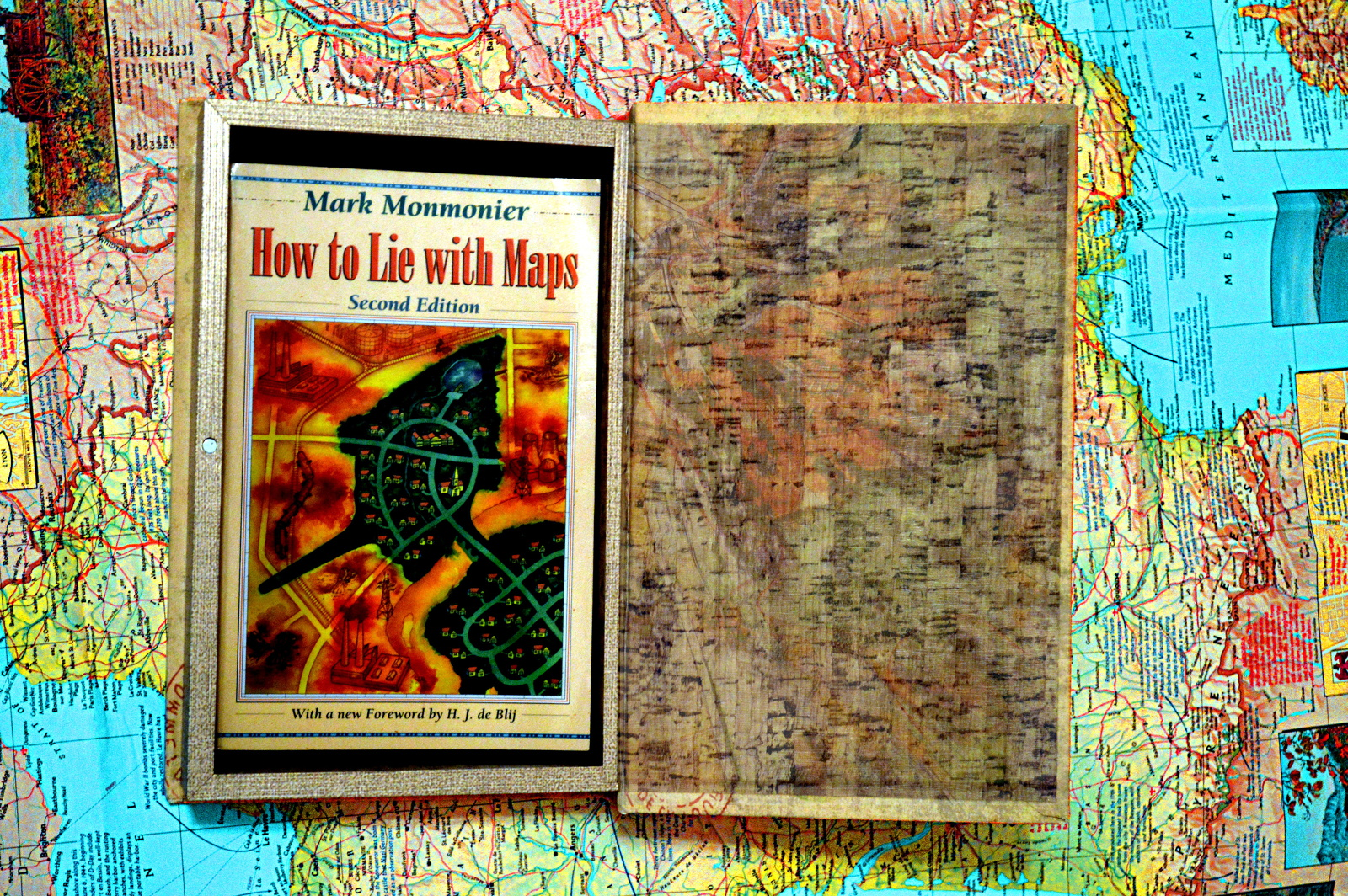
How to Lie with Maps 2nd edition

Title	Date	Publisher	Identifier	Citation(s)	Notes
Maps, Distortion, and Meaning	1977	Association of American Geographers	ISBN 0-89291-120-4		
Computer-assisted Cartography: Principles and Prospects	1982	Prentice-Hall	ISBN 0-13-165308-3		
Technological Transition in Cartography	1985	University of Wisconsin Press	ISBN 0-299-10070-7		
Maps with the News: the Development of American Journalistic Cartography	1989	University of Chicago Press	ISBN 0-226-53413-8		
How to Lie with Maps	1991, 1996, 2018	University of Chicago Press	ISBN 978-0-226-43592-3		
Mapping It Out: Expository Cartography for the Humanities and Social Sciences	1993	University of Chicago Press	ISBN 0-226-53417-0		
Drawing the Line: Tales of Maps and Cartocontroversy	1995	Henry Holt	ISBN 0-8050-2581-2		
Cartographies of Danger: Mapping Hazards in America	1997	University of Chicago Press	ISBN 0-226-53419-7		
Air Apparent: How Meteorologists Learned to Map, Predict, and Dramatize Weather	1999	University of Chicago Press	ISBN 0-226-53422-7		
Bushmanders & Bullwinkles: How Politicians Manipulate Electronic Maps and Census Data to Win Elections	2001	University of Chicago Press	ISBN 0-226-53424-3		
Spying with Maps: Surveillance Technologies and the Future of Privacy	2002	University of Chicago Press	ISBN 0-226-53427-8		
Rhumb Lines and Map Wars: a Social History of the Mercator Projection	2004	University of Chicago Press	ISBN 0-226-53431-6		
From Squaw Tit to Whorehouse Meadow: How Maps Name, Claim, and Inflame	2006	University of Chicago Press	ISBN 0-226-53465-0		
Coast Lines: How Mapmakers Frame the World and Chart Environmental Change	2008	University of Chicago Press	ISBN 0-226-53403-0		
No Dig, No Fly, No Go: How Maps Restrict and Control	2010	University of Chicago Press	ISBN 978-0-226-53467-1		
Lake Effect: Tales of Large Lakes, Arctic Winds, and Recurrent Snows	2012	Syracuse University Press	ISBN 978-0-8156-1004-5		
Adventures in Academic Cartography: A Memoir	2014, 2016	Syracuse, NY: Bar Scale Press	ISBN 9781523254316		(Note: Monmonier's autobiography.)
Patents and Cartographic Inventions: A New Perspective for Map History	2017	Palgrave Macmillan	ISBN 978-3-319-51039-2		
Connections and Content: Reflections on Networks and the History of Cartography	2019	Esri Press,	ISBN 978-1-58948-559-4		
Clock and Compass: How John Byron Plato Gave Farmers a Real Address	2022	University Of Iowa Press	ISBN 978-1609388218		

=== Co-authored books and edited volumes ===
Title	Co-author(s)	Date	Publisher	Identifier	Citation(s)	Notes
The Study of Population: Elements, Patterns, Processes	George A. Schnell	1983	Charles E. Merrill Publishing Co	ISBN 0-675-20046-6		
The History of Cartography: Cartography in the Traditional Islamic and South Asian Societies	George A. Schnell	1983	Charles E. Merrill Publishing Co	ISBN 0-675-20046-6		
Map Appreciation	George A. Schnell	1988	Prentice-Hall	ISBN 0-13-556052-7		
Volume Six of the History of Cartography:Cartography in the Twentieth Century		2015	University of Chicago Press	ISBN 9780226534695		(Note: Monmonier served as the chief editor, and wrote the Preface and Introduction)
A Directory of Cartographic Inventors: Clever People Awarded a US Patent for a Map-Related Device or Method	Adrienne Atterberry, Kayla Fermin, Gabrielle Marzolf, Madeline Hamlin	2018	Bar Scale Press	ISBN 978-1-985690-22-6		

=== Book chapters and encyclopedia entries ===
Chapter Title	Book title	Co-author(s)	Date	Publisher	Identifier	Citation(s)	Notes
The Three R's of Gis-Based Site Selection: Representation, Resistance, and Ridicule	Policy issues in modern Cartography		1998	Elsevier	doi:10.1016/S1363-0814(98)80014-2		
Thematic Maps in Geography	International Encyclopedia of the Social & Behavioral Sciences		2001	Elsevier	doi:10.1016/B0-08-043076-7/02533-X		
Chapter 6 - The Internet, Cartographic Surveillance, and Locational Privacy	Maps and the Internet		2003	Wiley-Blackwell	doi:10.1016/B978-008044201-3/50008-6		
Chapter 26 Cartography	Geography in America at the Dawn of the 21st Century	Robert B McMaster	2004	Oxford University Press	doi:10.1093/oso/9780198233923.003.0038		
Cartography	The Social Science Encyclopedia		2004	Taylor and Francis	ISBN 1134450842		
Chapter 2 POMP and circumstance: Plain old map products in a cybercartographic world	Modern Cartography Series		2005	Elsevier	doi:10.1016/S1363-0814(05)80005-X		
Geolocation and Locational Privacy: The “Inside” Story on Geospatial Tracking	Privacy and Technologies of Identity		2006	Springer	doi:10.1007/0-387-28222-X_5		
High-Resolution Coastal Elevation Data: The Key to Planning for Storm Surge and Sea Level Rise	Geospatial Technologies and Homeland Security		2008	Springer	doi:10.1007/978-1-4020-8507-9_11		
Web Cartography and the Dissemination of Cartographic Information about Coastal Inundation and Sea Level Rise	International perspectives on maps and the Internet		2008	Springer	doi:10.1007/978-3-540-72029-4_4		
A Century of Cartographic Change	The Map Reader: Theories of Mapping Practice and Cartographic Representation		2010	Wiley-Blackwell	ISBN 978-0470742839		(Note: Exerpt from Monmonier's book Technological Transitions in Cartogrpahy)
Strategies for the Visualization of Geographic Time-Series Data	The Map Reader: Theories of Mapping Practice and Cartographic Representation		2010	Wiley-Blackwell	ISBN 978-0470742839		(Note: Republished Monmonier's 1990 paper from Cartographica)
Strategies for the Visualization of Geographic Time-Series Data	Classics in Cartography: Reflections on Influential Articles from Cartographica		2011	John Wiley & Sons, Ltd	doi:10.1002/9780470669488.ch6		
Reflection Essay: Strategies for the Visualization of Geographic Time-Series Data	Classics in Cartography: Reflections on Influential Articles from Cartographica		2011	John Wiley & Sons, Ltd	doi:10.1002/9780470669488.ch7		
Maps that Say "No!": The Rise of Prohibitive Cartography	Geography and Social Justice in the Classroom		2013	Routledge	ISBN 9781138108707		
Innovation and Inertia in Atmospheric and Census Cartography in Nineteenth- and Twentieth-Century America	Visible Numbers		2016	Routledge	ISBN 9781315084275		
Cartography	International Encyclopedia of Geography: People, the Earth, Environment and Technology		2017	John Wiley & Sons, Ltd.	doi:10.1002/9781118786352.wbieg0359		
Hunches and hopes	The Routledge Handbook of Mapping and Cartography		2017	Routledge	ISBN 9781315736822		
‘Change-of-State’ in the History of Cartography	Motion in Maps, Maps in Motion		2020	Amsterdam University Press	doi:10.1515/9789048542956-010		

== Peer reviewed Articles ==
=== Single author articles ===
Title	Date	Journal/Publication	Identifier	Citation(s)	Notes
The production of shaded maps on the digital computer	1965	The Professional Geographer	doi:10.1111/j.0033-0124.1965.013_r.x		
Computer mapping with the digital increment plotter	1968	The Professional Geographer	doi:10.1111/j.0033-0124.1968.00408.x		
Shaded area symbols for the digital increment plotter	1970	Tijdschrift voor economische en sociale geografie	doi:10.1111/j.1467-9663.1970.tb00487.x		
A Spatially-Controlled Principal Components Analysis	1970	Geographical Analysis	doi:10.1111/j.1538-4632.1970.tb00156.x		
Digitized map measurement and correlation applied to an example in crop ecology	1971	Geographical Review	doi:10.2307/213367		
Upland adjustment to regional drainage in central Pennsylvania: an application of trend surface analysis	1971	Journal of Geography	doi:10.1080/00221347108981657		
Comparison of quantitative regionalization methods	1972	Geographical Review			
Contiguity-Biased Class-Interval Selection: A Method for Simplifying Patterns on Statistical Maps	1972	Geographical Review	doi:10.2307/213213		
Flow‐linkage construction for spatial trend recognition	1972	Geographical Analysis	doi:10.1111/j.1538-4632.1972.tb00484.x		
Maximum-Difference Barriers : An Alternative Numerical Regiodization Method*	1973	Geographical Analysis	doi:10.1111/j.1538-4632.1973.tb01011.x		(Note: Journal where Monmonier first published his "Maximum-difference boundary" algorithm that would later be called the "Monmonier Algorithm")
Measures of Pattern Complexity for Choroplethic Maps	1974	The American Cartographer	doi:10.1559/152304074784107728		
Maximizing the information content of maps of spatial-temporal disease distributions	1974	Cartographica	doi:10.3138/R304-4605-34XX-5W00		
Internally-stored Scan-lines for Line-printer Mapping	1975	The American Cartographer	doi:10.1559/152304075784313232		
Class Intervals to Enhance the Visual Correlation of Choroplethic Maps	1975	Cartographica	doi:10.3138/B588-2228-2H14-U7X5		
Jacques M. May	1976	The Professional Geographer	doi:10.1111/j.0033-0124.1976.00093.x		
Modifying objective functions and constraints for maximizing visual correspondence of choroplethic maps	1976	Cartographica	doi:10.1111/j.0033-0124.1976.00093.x		
Regression-based Scaling to Facilitate the Cross-correlation of Graduated Circle Maps	1977	The Cartographic Journal	doi:10.1179/caj.1977.14.2.89		
The significance and symbolization of trend direction	1977	The Cartographic Journal	doi:10.3138/5634-37V5-45KX-G687		
Viewing Azimuth and Map Clarity	1978	Annals of the American Association of Geographers	doi:10.3138/5634-37V5-45KX-G687		
Estimates of trend direction/ vagueness and bias in map reading	1979	Canadian Cartography			
Modelling the Effect of Reproduction Noise on Continuous-tone Area Symbols	1979	The Cartographic Journal	doi:10.1179/caj.1979.16.2.86		
The hopeless pursuit of purification in cartographic communication: A comparison of graphic-arts and perceptual distortions of graytone symbols	1980	Cartographica	doi:10.3138/YN3W-XL03-6218-0558		
Automated Techniques in Support of Planning for the National Atlas	1981	The American Cartographer	doi:10.1559/152304081784447390		
Trends in atlas development	1981	Cartographica	doi:10.3138/1572-LG43-R75T-5455		
Street Maps And Private-Sector Map Making/A Case Study Of Two Firms	1981	Cartographica	doi:10.3138/U644-7V56-5731-8443		
Map-text coordination in geographic writing	1981	The Professional Geographer	doi:10.1111/j.0033-0124.1981.00406.x		
Flat Laxity, Optimization, And Rounding In The Selection Of Class Intervals	1982	Cartographica	doi:10.3138/E553-4G4L-28P1-8741		
Cartography and Mapping	1982	Progress in Human Geography	doi:10.3138/E553-4G4L-28P1-8741		
Cartography, geographic information, and public policy	1982	Progress in Human Geography	doi:10.1080/03098268208708847		
Comments on “Automated Geography”	1983	Progress in Human Geography	doi:10.1111/j.0033-0124.1983.00346.x		
Cartography, mapping and geographic information	1983	Progress in Human Geography	doi:10.1177/03091325830070030		
Raster-mode area generalization for land use and land cover maps	1983	Cartographica	doi:10.3138/X572-0327-4670-1573		
More on mapping	1984	Journal of Geography in Higher Education	doi:10.1080/03098268408708903		
Geographic Information and Cartography	1984	Progress in Human Geography	doi:10.1177/030913258400800303		
Former Editor Protests Censorship	1985	The American Cartographer	doi:10.1177/030913258400800303		
The rise of map use by elite newspapers in England, Canada, and the United States	1987	Imago Mundi	doi:10.1080/03085698608592604		
Displacement in vector-and raster-mode graphics	1987	Cartographica	doi:10.3138/FW8R-2122-PT42-53M2		
Telegraphy, iconography, and the weather map: Cartographic weather reports by the United States Weather Bureau, 1870–1935	1988	Imago Mundi	doi:10.1080/03085698808592636		
Geographic brushing: Enhancing exploratory analysis of the scatterplot matrix	1989	Geographical analysis	doi:10.1111/j.1538-4632.1989.tb00879.x		
Regionalizing and matching features for interpolated displacement in the automated generalization of digital cartographic databases	1989	Cartographica	doi:10.3138/5T71-3231-7N24-P0J8		
Interpolated Generalization: Cartographic Theory For Expert guided Feature Displacement	1989	Cartographica	doi:10.3138/V700-H680-077Q-6503		
Strategies for the visualization of geographic time-series data	1990	Cartographica	doi:10.3138/U558-H737-6577-8U31		
Graphically encoded knowledge bases for expert-guided feature generalization in cartographic display systems	1990	International Journal of Expert Systems			
Cartography at Syracuse University	1991	Cartography and Geographic Information Systems	doi:10.1559/152304091783786943		
Ethics and map design: Six strategies for confronting the traditional one-map solution	1991	Cartographic Perspectives	doi:10.14714/CP10.1052		
Authoring Graphic Scripts: Experiences and Principles	1992	Cartography and Geographic Information Systems	doi:10.1559/152304092783721240		
Summary Graphics for Integrated Visualization in Dynamic Cartography	1992	Cartography and Geographic Information Systems	doi:10.1559/152304092783786681		
Exploring the Quality of Enumeration-Area Data with Graphic Scripts	1993	Cartographica	doi:10.3138/K633-0844-JX85-8PN1		
What a Friend We Have in GIS	1993	The Professional Geographer	doi:10.1111/j.0033-0124.1993.00448.x		
The Rise of the National Atlas	1994	Cartographica	doi:10.3138/T3NN-QL75-753L-25G7		
Temporal Generalization for Dynamic Maps	1996	Cartography and Geographic Information Systems	doi:10.1559/152304096782562118		
Geography And Cartography In The Twenty-First Century	1996	Cartographic Perspectives	doi:10.14714/CP23.773		
Civil War Newspaper Maps: A Historical Atlas	1996	Imago Mundi	doi:10.14714/CP23.773		
Anatomy of a Cartographic Surrogate: the Portrayal of Complex Electoral Boundaries in the Congressional District Atlas	2000	Cartographic Perspectives	doi:10.14714/CP35.837		
Webcams, Interactive Index Maps, and Our Brave New World’s Brave New Globe	2000	Cartographic Perspectives	doi:10.14714/CP37.809		
Aerial Photography at the Agricultural Adjustment Administration: Acreage Controls, Conservation Benefits, and Overhead Surveillance in the 1930s	2002	Photogrammetric Engineering & Remote Sensing			
Cartography: distortions, world-views and creative solutions	2005	Progress in Human Geography	doi:10.1191/0309132505ph540pr		
Lying with Maps	2005	Statistical Science	doi:10.1214/088342305000000241		
Critic, Deconstruct Thyself: A Rejoinder to Koch's Nonsense of Snow	2005	Cartographica	doi:10.3138/N2Q6-0582-0254-7157		
Cartography: uncertainty, interventions, and dynamic display	2006	Progress in Human Geography	doi:10.1191/0309132506ph612pr		
Cartography: the multidisciplinary pluralism of cartographic art, geospatial technology, and empirical scholarship	2007	Progress in Human Geography	doi:10.1177/0309132507077089		
History, Jargon, Privacy and Multiple Vulnerabilities	2013	The Cartographic Journal	doi:10.1179/0008704113Z.00000000084		
Twentieth-Century Themes for the Progressive Map Collection	2015	Cartographic Perspectives	doi:10.14714/CP81.1334		
Motives for Patenting a Map Projection: Did Fame Trump Fortune?	2018	The Cartographic Journal	doi:10.1080/00087041.2018.1448563		
Waldo R. Tobler (1930–2018)	2019	Imago Mundi	doi:10.1080/03085694.2019.1529916		

=== Co-authored articles ===
Title	Co-author(s)	Date	Journal/Publication	Identifier	Citation(s)	Notes
Improving the interpretation of geographical canonical correlation models	Fay Evanko Finn	1973	The Professional Geographer	doi:10.1111/j.0033-0124.1973.00140.x		
Interstate Migration of Physicians in the United States: the Case of 1955–1959 Graduates	George A Schnell	1976	The Professional Geographer	doi:10.1111/j.0033-0124.1976.00029.x		
U.S. Population Change 1960–70: Simplification, Meaning, And Mapping	George A Schnell	1976	Journal of Geography	doi:10.1080/00221347608980364		
Maps in Minds: Reflections on Cognitive Mapping	Roger M. Downs, David Stea	1976	Geographical Review	doi:10.2307/215060		
The mortality-fertility ratio: a useful measure for describing demographic change in the United States, 1940-1975.	George A Schnell	1979	Geographical survey	doi:10.2307/215060		
Focus Groups for Design Improvement in Dynamic Cartography	Myke Gluck	1979	Cartography and Geographic Information Systems	doi:10.1559/152304094782563948		
GIS in New York State county emergency management offices: User assessment	Alberto Giordano	1998	Applied Geographic Studies	doi:10.1002/(SICI)1520-6319(199822)2:2<95::AID-AGS2>3.0.CO;2-M		
The Exploratory Essays Initiative: Background and Overview	David Woodward	2002	Cartography and Geographic Information Science	doi:10.1559/152304002782008477		

== Book reviews ==
Title	Date	Journal/Publication	Identifier	Citation(s)	Notes
Review work: Medical Geography: Techniques and Field Studies	1972	Annals of the American Association of Geographers	doi:10.1111/j.1467-8306.1973.tb00923.x		
Reviewed Work: Graphic Communication and Design in Contemporary Cartography D. R. Fraser Taylor	1984	Geographical Review	doi:10.2307/214769		
Reviewed Work: Mapping Information: The Graphic Display of Quantitative Information Howard T. Fisher	1984	Annals of the American Association of Geographers			
Reviewed Works: Semiology of Graphics: Diagrams, Networks, Maps by Jacques Bertin, William J. Berg; The Visual Display of Quantitative Information Edward R. Tufte	1985	Annals of the American Association of Geographers			
Education and training in contemporary cartography: A review	1985	Journal of Geography in Higher Education	doi:10.1080/03098268708709010		
Reviewed Work: Monarchs, Ministers, and Maps: The Emergence of Cartography as a Tool of Government in Early Modern Europe David Buisseret	1993	Annals of the American Association of Geographers	doi:10.1080/03098268708709010		
Reviewed Work: Picturing Knowledge: Historical and Philosophical Problems concerning the Use of Art in Science Brian S. Baigrie	1997	Geographical Review	doi:10.2307/216046		
Book Review: Framework for the world.	1999	Progress in Human Geography	doi:10.1191/030913299672250859		
Reviewed Work: South Carolina Atlas of Environmental Risks and Hazards by Susan L. Cutter, Deborah S. K. Thomas, Micah E. Cutler, Jerry T. Mitchell, Michael S. Scott	2000	Annals of the American Association of Geographers			
Review: The New Nature of Maps: Essays in the History of Cartography	2001	Cartographic Perspectives	doi:10.14714/CP40.598		
A Review of “Putting “America” on the Map: The Story of the Most Important Graphic Document in the History of the United States”	2009	The Professional Geographer	doi:10.1080/00330120902743621		
On the Edge: Mapping North America’s Coasts by Roger M. McCoy (review)	2009	Cartographica			
Cartographic Japan: A History in Maps	2017	The AAG Review of Books	doi:10.1080/2325548X.2017.1257267		
Dark spaces on the map	2021	Technology Review			
Review of Emma Willard: Maps of History	2023	Cartographic Perspectives	doi:10.14714/CP101.1829		

== See also ==
- Cynthia Brewer – American geographer (born 1960)
- Concepts and Techniques in Modern Geography – Series of geography texts, 1975–1996
- Geographia Generalis – Geography textbook by Bernhardus Varenius
- Geographic information science – Scientific discipline
- George F. Jenks – American geographer and cartographer
- Mei-Po Kwan – Geographer
- Scientific Geography Series – Series of geography publications, 1985–1988
- Technical geography – Study of spatial information
- Waldo Tobler bibliography – Geographer Waldo Tobler's publications
