= Theoretical Geography =

1962 book by William Bunge

- Theoretical Geography
- Author: William Bunge
- Publisher: Lund Studies in Geography
- Publication date: 1962
- Pages: 210
- ISBN: 9789140024565

Theoretical Geography is a book by geographer William Bunge, first published in 1962, with a second edition released in 1966. The book is considered a foundational text in quantitative geography and spatial analysis, significantly influencing the development of modern geographical thought.

== Overview ==
Bunge based Theoretical geography on his Ph.D. dissertation, first publishing it in 1962, with a second edition in 1966. The book is broken into an acknowledgments section, an introduction, and seven chapters; A Geographic Methodology, Metacartography, A Measure of Shape, Descriptive Mathematics, Toward a General Theory of Movement, Experimental and Theoretical Central Place, and Distance, Nearness and Geometry. The book concludes with a Bibliography. The text centers on the debate between nomothetic and idiographic perspectives on science, where the nomothetic side asserts results need to be generalizable to other locations, and the idiographic approach looks to understand and describe what makes a specific place unique without looking to apply these discoveries more broadly. Bunge takes the nomothetic side in the text, rejecting idiographic as a marginal science, and arguing for the use of geometry to study geography and create natural laws, stating in the introduction:

"The basic approach is to assume that geography is a strict science and then proceed to examine the substantive results of such an assumption."

— Theoretical Geography, 1962,

Along these lines, Bunge argues that when approached from a spatial and mathematical perspective, human geography and physical geography have no major differences, arguing for an emphasis on integrated geography. Bunge also defines maps as a subset of mathematics in his chapter "metacartography", defining them in terms of geometry.

== Impact and reception ==
Animation illustrating central place theory

Theoretical Geography played a crucial role in shaping modern geography by reinforcing the discipline's scientific foundations. It contributed to the rise of analytical geography and spatial science, influencing subsequent research in urban planning, transportation geography, analytical cartography, and geographic information systems (GIS) in the decades after its release. The book also sparked debates between proponents of quantitative methods and those favoring humanistic and cultural approaches, leading to the diversification of geographical thought in later decades. Kevin R. Cox described the text as "perhaps the seminal text of the spatial-quantitative revolution," and Bill MacMillan described it as "a major landmark in the history of geographical thought". Trevor J. Barnes and Luke R. Bergmann describe the text as "the most sophisticated and evangelical of the early writings on geography's quantitative revolution". Theoretical Geography was discussed in a chapter in the textbook Key Texts in Human Geography, and discussed as part of the "Classics in human geography revisited" series in Progress in Human Geography.

The work was heavily criticized by several geographers, even before its publication. Before publication, Theoretical geography was sent to geographer Richard Hartshorne by the University of Washington Press, and according to a letter written by Bunge to Torsten Hägerstrand, Hartshorne stated the book should be "burned". Hägerstrand published Bunge's manuscript in his "Series C, Lund Studies in Geography" when these comments from Hartshore kept the University of Washington Press from publishing it. Some have argued that its abstract and overly mathematical approach, limits its applicability to the complexities of real-world human and environmental systems. Michael Goodchild noted that there is little mathematics in the book, and that it was others who ultimately built up the literature on quantitative geography and "rigorous" theory in subsequent decades. Goodchild argues that many of the arguments in the text do not stand up under careful scrutiny, especially with the benefit of hindsight. Cox argues that what he calls "unabashed, unselfconscious positivism" dates the text, and that many of the examples used to link human and physical geography fail to stand up to deeper analysis. Critics from the humanistic and cultural geography traditions have contended that Bunge's emphasis on spatial logic and formal models overlooks the importance of place, meaning, and human experience. Bill Macmillan argues against Bunge's definition of maps as a subset of mathematics, and criticises his emphasis on central place theory and theory of movement. Nevertheless, Goodchild, Macmillian, and Cox all argue that the text is significant in understanding the history and development of geography as a discipline.

Bunge's focus on Central place theory within the text has been discussed and criticized. One paper by Sabir Gusein-Zade discussed a problem in central place theory described by Bunge, specifically related to arranging city centers with variable density within an area. Because most models of the time assumed a consistent population density, Gusein-Zade argued it was difficult to apply Central place theory to reality. Bunge tried to solve this problem by deforming the plane to create a constant population density, which Gusein-Zade argued created the problem of distoring distances while attempting to solve the population density problem. To address this problem, Gusein-Zade proposed a series of mathematical formulas that he argued would create models that better corresponded to observations. In a response paper to Gusein-Zade's, G. Edward Stephan and Mitchell L. Eggers heavily criticized the work and argued he was incorrect.

== Author ==
William Bunge (born 1928, La Crosse, Wisconsin; died October 31, 2013, Canada) was conscripted into the U.S. Army during the Korean War. He earned his Ph.D. from the University of Washington Department of Geography and worked under both Edward Ullman and William Garrison. His cohort (dubbed the "space cadets") included geographers Brian Berry, Duane Marble, Michael Dacey, Arthur Getis, and Waldo R. Tobler. Bunge's Theoretical Geography was mostly written while he was a graduate student in this environment, and the influence can be seen in the publication. The book discusses the work of his fellow students, and several figures in the text were developed by his fellow students, such as a cartogram made by Getis. Geographer Torsten Hägerstrand described Bunge as having a "streak of genius," and Trevor J. Barnes stated he preferred "to call it a streak of creativity". Bunge was a communist, and later listed as one of 65 radicals by the Chairman of the U.S. House of Representatives Internal Security Committee. Bunge later expressed the belief that he "fully expected to be in a concentration camp within a year". Bunge's politics and behavior ultimately made him unable to maintain an academic career, with him choosing to leave the U.S. to live in Canada.

== See also ==
- Concepts and Techniques in Modern Geography – Series of geography texts, 1975–1996
- Critical cartography – Mapping practices and methods of analysis grounded in critical theory
- Geographia Generalis – Geography textbook by Bernhardus Varenius
- How to Lie with Maps – 1991 book by Mark Monmonier
- Scientific Geography Series – Series of geography publications, 1985–1988
- Technological Transition in Cartography – 1985 book by Mark Monmonier
