= Vernon Singhroy =

InSAR, Geohazards, Scientists,

Vernon Singhroy is a Canadian remote sensing scientist and engineer specializing in radar applications for geological mapping and infrastructure monitoring. He served as Chief Scientist for the Canadian Space Agency's RADARSAT Constellation Mission and Principal Investigator for RADARSAT 1 and RADARSAT 2. He has published extensively on radar interferometry for landslide monitoring.

== Early life and education ==
Singhroy was born in DeHoop, Mahaica, Guyana, and grew up at Union Village, West Coast Berbice, where his parents worked as rice farmers, cattle ranchers, and rice millers. He graduated from Berbice High School in New Amsterdam, Guyana. He completed his undergraduate education at McMaster University, obtaining an Honours bachelor's degree in Earth Sciences. He earned a master's degree from the University of Manitoba before completing his Ph.D. in Environmental and Resource Engineering at the State University of New York at Syracuse. He is a registered Professional Engineer in Ontario.

== Career ==
=== RADARSAT Constellation Mission ===
As Chief Scientist for the Canadian Space Agency's RADARSAT Constellation Mission (RCM), and the Canada Centre for Remote Sensing (CCRS) application scientist for RADARSAT 1 and 2, he contributed to the development of geological image interpretation techniques and applications for infrastructure monitoring.The RCM mission provides rapid-revisit radar imaging capabilities for monitoring environmental changes and natural resources, with high-resolution InSAR data available every four days. His work has helped position Canadian radar science at the forefront of operational monitoring and applied geospatial intelligence.

=== Academic positions ===
From 1998 to 2020, Singhroy held a position as Professor of Earth Observation at the International Space University (ISU) in Strasbourg, France, where he chaired the Satellite Applications department at the ISU Summer Sessions. He has also served as an adjunct professor at the University of New Brunswick in Planetary and Space Sciences and at the University of Ottawa in Geography and Environmental Sciences.

=== EOSPATIAL Inc. ===
Singhroy is President of EOSPATIAL Inc., a company based in Ottawa that provides satellite-based remote sensing solutions for infrastructure monitoring, environmental assessment, and resource management.

=== Publications and editorial work ===
Singhroy has authored over 300 scholarly papers and satellite image maps. He served as editor-in-chief of the Canadian Journal of Remote Sensing from 1993 to 1997. His editorial work includes serving as a section editor for the Encyclopedia of Remote Sensing (Springer, 2014), and edited the Advances in Remote Sensing for Infrastructure Monitoring (Springer, 2021).

=== Awards and honors ===
Singhroy has received several awards for his work in remote sensing:

- Gold Medal Award from the Canadian Remote Sensing Society (2010)
- Natural Resources Canada Deputy Minister Career Achievement Award (2014)
- Queen Elizabeth II Diamond Jubilee Medal (2012)
- ASTM International Engineering Standards Special Service Award
- Guyana Special Achievement Award
