= Department of Geography (University of Washington) =

Department of the University of Washington

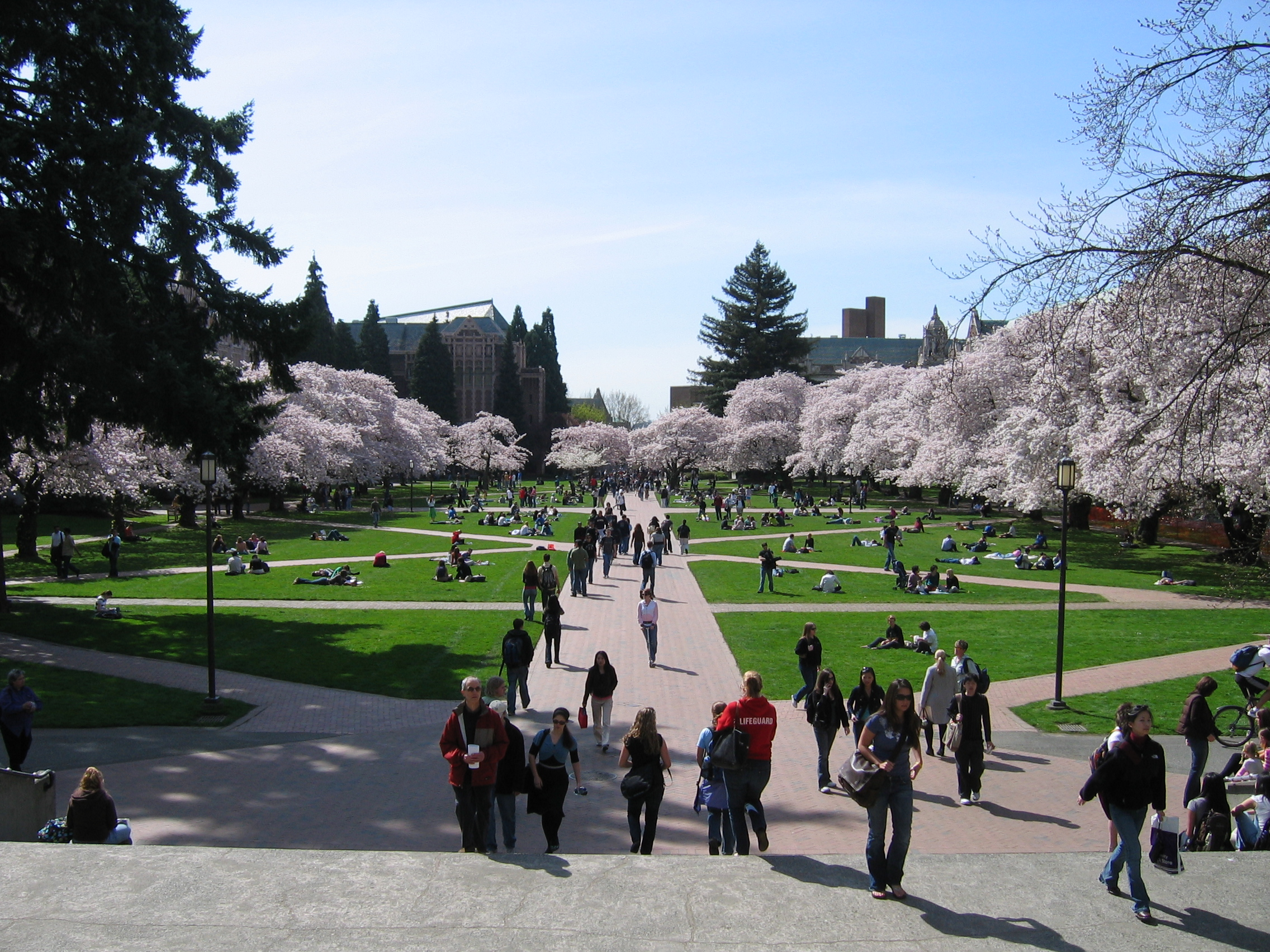
- Parent institution: University of Washington College of Arts and Sciences
- Location: Seattle, Washington, USA; 47.6566°N 122.3074°W
- Website: geography.washington.edu

The Department of Geography is an academic department within the Social Sciences Division at the College of Arts and Sciences at the University of Washington.

== History ==
Coursework in geography have been offered at the University of Washington at least since the 1890s, although no department was formally established. Early courses included political geography and physical geography.

When the university was reorganized at its new location between Lake Union and Lake Washington in 1895, geography coursework was offered through the Department of Geology and Mineralogy in Denny Hall. Science Hall (now Parrington Hall) would become the new home for the department in 1902. Direction for new geographic coursework came under Henry Landes, who was head of the department, and had studied with William Morris Davis at Harvard University.

George T. Renner (Columbia) was hired in 1927 as the first geographer, and expanded the course offerings, which were dominated by physical geography. New courses included economic geography and human geography. In 1928, the department's title was renamed Department of Geology and Geography. Since 1928, there have been twelve heads (or chairs) of the department (Geography would become its own department in 1935):

1. Henry Landes, 1895–1935
2. Howard Martin, 1935–50
3. Donald Hudson, 1950–63
4. John Sherman, 1963–73
5. Richard Morrill, 1973–83
6. Morgan Thomas, 1983–90
7. William Beyers, 1990–95, 2005–08
8. David Hodge, 1995–97
9. Victoria Lawson, 1997–2000
10. J.W. Harrington, 2000–05
11. Katharyne Mitchell, 2008–13
12. Lucy A. Jarosz, 2013–18
13. Sarah Elwood, 2018–present

In 1942, the Department of Geography moved into its present location, Smith Hall on the Quad. Since the start of their graduate program in 1928, the department has granted over 500 M.A. degrees and over 300 Ph.D. degrees.

== Alumni and Faculty ==
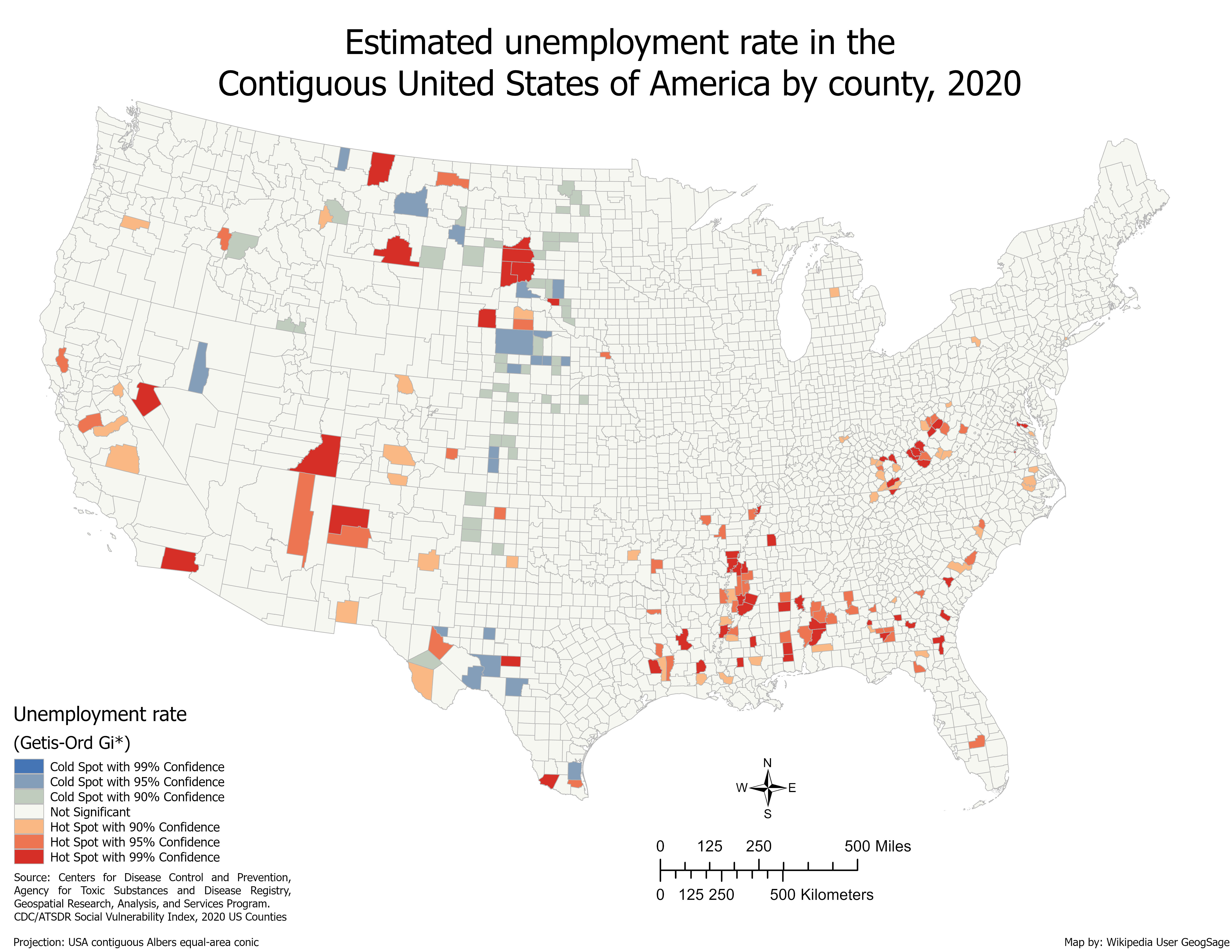
Hot spot map showing hot and cold spots in the 2020 USA Contiguous Unemployment Rate, calculated using Getis Ord Gi*

The Tobler hyperelliptical projection with Tissot's indicatrix of deformation; α = 0, k = 3

The Department of Geography at the University of Washington was highly influential in the Quantitative revolution in geography. Notably, a cohort of students working under Edward Ullman and William Garrison, dubbed the "Space cadets," went on to lead influential careers in the discipline. This cohort included Brian Berry, Duane Marble, William Bunge, Michael Dacey, Arthur Getis, and Waldo Tobler. William Bunge's dissertation while at the University of Washington went on to be published as a book titled Theoretical Geography, and is considered foundational to the development of geographical thought. Arthur Getis was a prolific publisher, and helped create the family of Getis–Ord statistics used in hot spot analysis and the creation of hot spot maps. Waldo Tobler, nicknamed "Ptobler" by his fellow space cadets as "the greatest cartographer since Ptolemy", had a large number of influential publications. While a graduate student at the University of Washington, Tobler published the first paper discussing Computer cartography, and later pioneered the discipline of analytical cartography. Throughout his career, Tobler made multiple contributions, perhaps most notably coining the first and second laws of geography.
