= Mark Monmonier =

American geographer and cartographer

Mark Stephen Monmonier
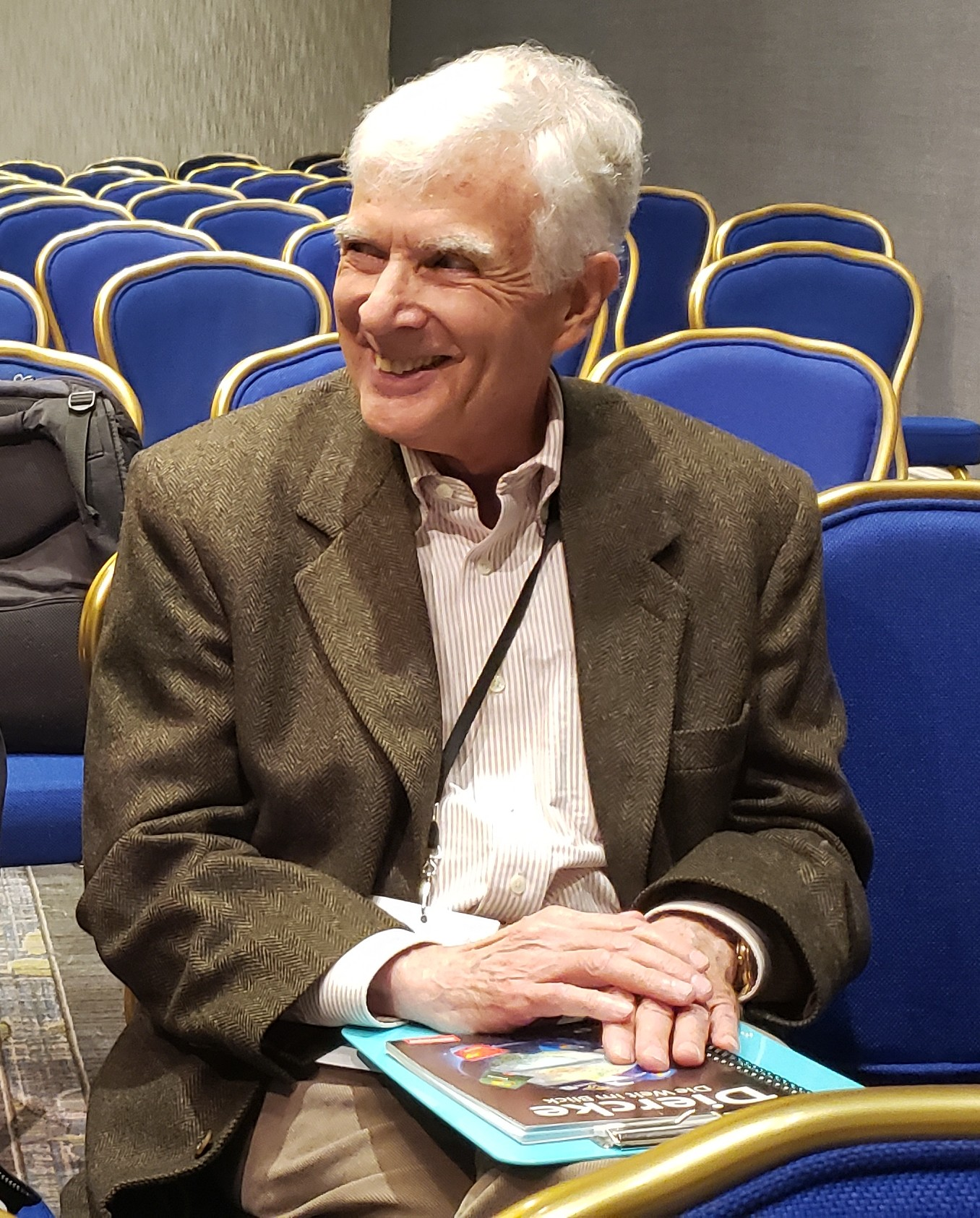
- Mark Monmonier at American Association of Geographers' 2019 conference
- Born: February 2, 1943 (age 83); Baltimore, Maryland
- Education: Pennsylvania State University; Johns Hopkins University
- Spouse: Margaret Janet Kollner (m. 1965)
- Children: 1
- Awards: German Cartographic Society's Mercator Medal (2008); American Geographical Society's Osborn Maitland Miller Medal (2001); Guggenheim Fellowship (1984)
- Scientific career
- Workplaces: Syracuse University
- Thesis: On the Use of Digitized Map Sampling and Measurement: An Example in Crop Ecology (September 1969)
- Doctoral advisors: George F. Deasy; Anthony Williams
- Website: www.markmonmonier.com

Mark Stephen Monmonier (born February 2, 1943) is a Distinguished Professor of Geography and the Environment at the Maxwell School of Citizenship and Public Affairs of Syracuse University. He specializes in geography, geographic information systems, toponymy, and the history of cartography.

== Early life ==
Monmonier was born in Baltimore, Maryland to parents John Carroll Monmonier and Martha Monmonier. His father worked for the Baltimore and Ohio Railroad, and his mother worked as an elementary school teacher, teaching 5th grade. His father's career enabled their family to travel via rail through the use of his employee pass, and Monmonier was exposed to several transit maps and developed an early interest in rail transportation. He attended Calvert Hall College High School, and spent time at the Enoch Pratt Free Library, where he attended lectures and was exposed to the Maryland Geological Survey reports, which contributed to an interest in geology and networks.

== Education and field ==
Monmonier first attended Johns Hopkins University to pursue a bachelor's in engineering, focusing on geophysical mechanics, under a Maryland State Engineering Scholarship. He switched majors due to changing interests, going on to earn two BAs in 1964 from Johns Hopkins University, one in geology and another in mathematics, under the Fredrick E. Blaser Scholarship. He started graduate school at the University of Maryland, where he worked with professors Azriel Rosenfeld and John Pfaltz. Monmonier left the University of Maryland, due to frustration with the department's regional geography class, to join the graduate program at Pennsylvania State University, which had offered him a three-year fellowship. He earned an M.S. in geography in 1967, and Ph.D. in 1969, both from Pennsylvania State University. His dissertation was titled On the Use of Digitized Map Sampling and Measurement: An Example in Crop Ecology, and focused on overlay analysis, building on his work with Azriel Rosenfeld and John Pfaltz.

== Career and academic organizations ==
=== Student jobs and organizations ===
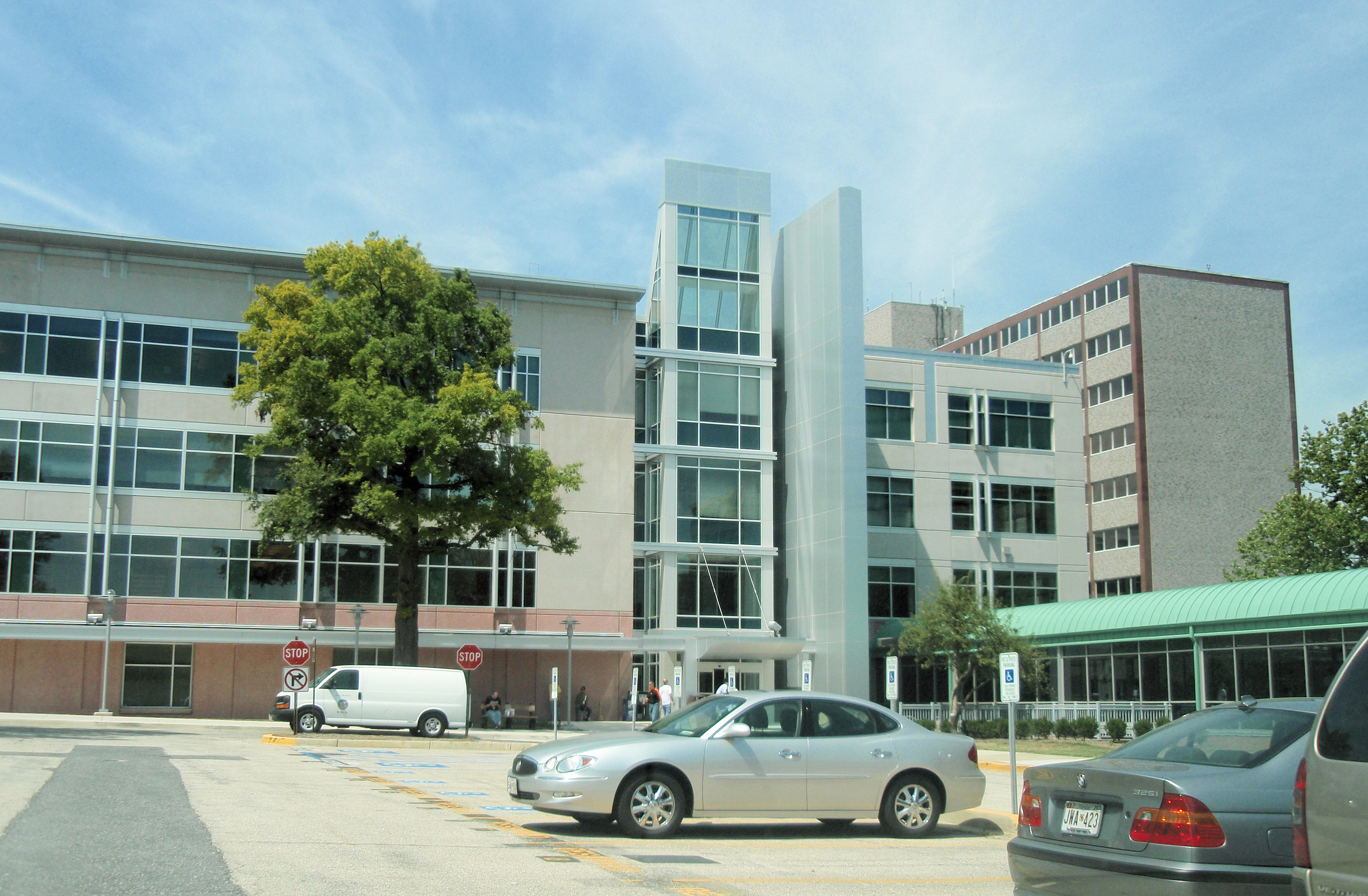
Part of SSA headquarters in Woodlawn, Maryland

As an undergraduate, Monmonier was a member of two honorary fraternities, Pi Tau Sigma and Tau Beta Pi. He worked as a GS-2 file clerk over the summers for the Social Security Administration in Woodlawn, Maryland and worked part-time in the Johns Hopkins University library reshelving books. As a graduate student at the University of Maryland, Monmonier was denied a position as a teaching assistant due to a speech impediment, and worked as a graduate assistant at the school's Computer Science Center. At Pennsylvania State University, he was funded for three years as a National Defense Education Act fellow while working. Once the NDEA fellowship ended, he was funded at Pennsylvania State University as a teaching assistant, where he ran lab sections for Physical Geography, and worked with Peirce F. Lewis. When Lewis went on sabbatical, Monmonier covered his Physiography of the United States course as the primary instructor.

=== University of Rhode Island ===
After getting his Ph.D., Monmonier began his academic career as assistant professor of Geography at the University of Rhode Island in 1969, where he was hired to teach cartography and quantitative methods. An interdepartmental dispute that may have resulted in Monmonier being forced to be the department chair caused him to seek employment elsewhere.

=== State University of New York at Albany ===
After a year at the University of Rhode Island, Monmonier started at State University of New York at Albany (SUNY) in 1970 as an assistant professor of geography. Due to bureaucratic issues and frustration with pay cuts and parking, he left SUNY in 1973.

=== Syracuse University ===
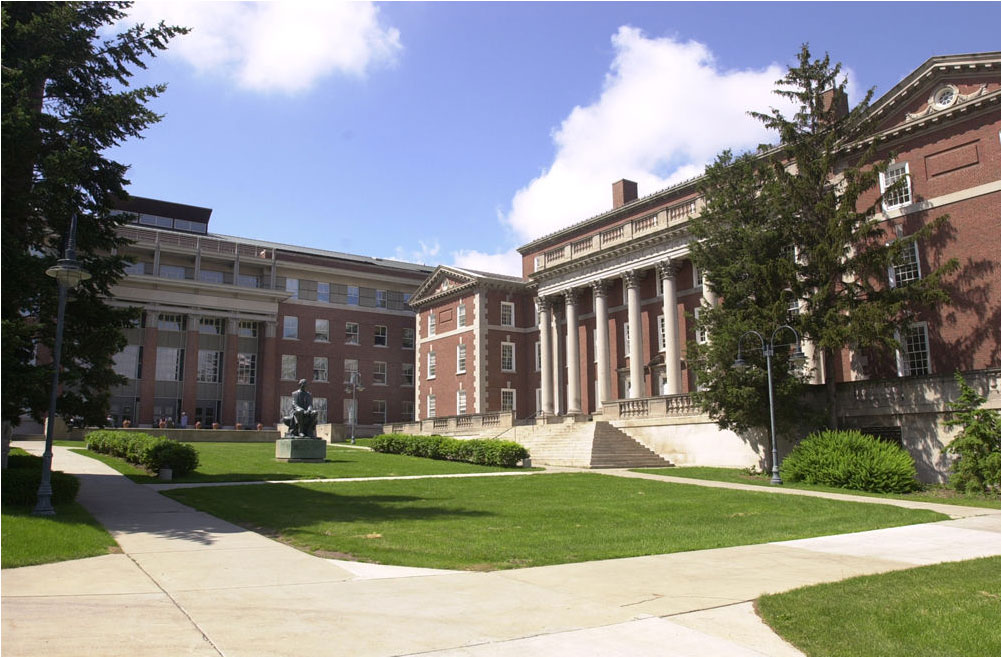
Maxwell School of Citizenship and Public Affairs

After learning from geographer Justin Friberg that Syracuse University was having difficulty hiring a cartography professor, and frustrated with SUNY, Monmonier accepted a position as associate professor of geography in the Maxwell School of Citizenship and Public Affairs at Syracuse University in 1973. He was promoted to full professor in 1978, and Distinguished Professor in 1998. He continued work at Syracuse University until his retirement in May 2021. He is currently Distinguished Professor Emeritus of Geography and the Environment at the Maxwell School at Syracuse University.

=== Other organizations ===
Monmonier served in numerous roles in the American Association of Geographers, and on panels advising the National Research Council and the Environmental Protection Agency. He worked as a consultant on several projects, including as a GS-13 Research Geographer for the United States Geological Survey, as a consultant on legal cases, and as part of a committee to help the National Geographic Society select a new map projection for world maps. He was the vice president of the American Cartographic Association between 1982 and 1983, and president between 1983 and 1984.

== Research and publications ==
Monmonier's research has had multiple focuses. His early research was focused on methods of using computers to manage geographic data, and the application of these methods to problems in geomorphology, health, and agriculture. His work also focused on topics such as the history of geography and cartography, and the social implications of maps. He published several books aimed at the general population on the topics of cartography and geography, as well as several more traditional textbooks. Monmonier's emphasis on publishing books is noted by geographer Russell S. Kirby as standing out from contemporary academics. He also wrote extensively on the use of maps for surveillance and as analytical and persuasive tools in politics, journalism, environmental science, and public administration.

=== Books ===
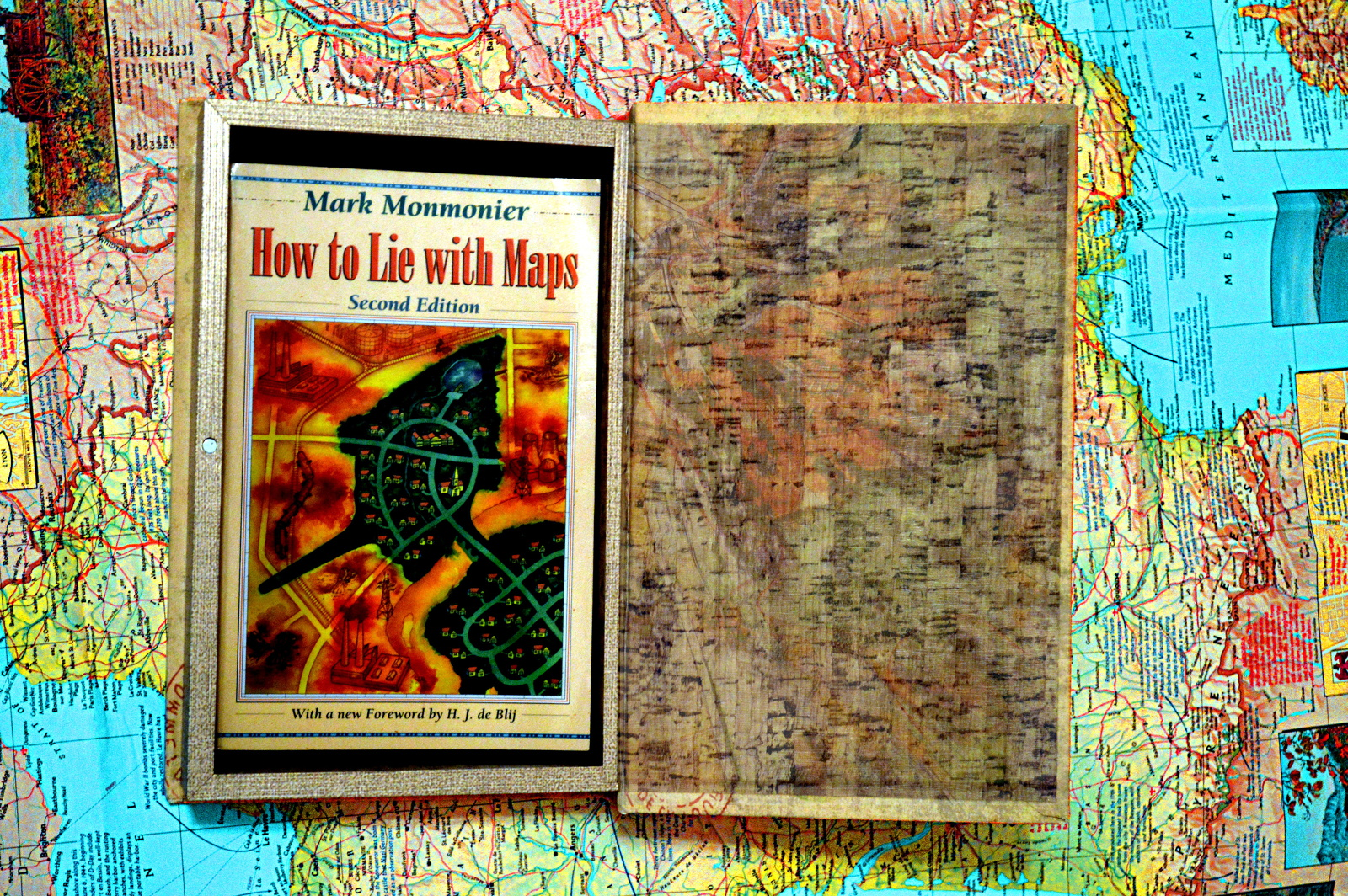
How to lie with maps 2nd edition

Monmonier has authored over 20 books, and his popular written works show a combination of serious study and a sense of humor. This is apparent in his most popular book, How to Lie with Maps, which has been praised for explaining complex technical concepts in cartography in a way that is engaging and understandable to non-professionals. Despite being digestable by non-professionals, How to lie with maps is described as one of the essential texts for cartographers, and "the closest thing to a religious text we have in cartography."

Other of his books are aimed at more advanced audiences, or designed to serve as traditional textbooks. Computer-Assisted Cartography: Principles and Prospects was the first commercial textbook on using computers in the cartographic process. In Technological Transition in Cartography, he provided analysis of the technological changes that occurred in cartography from the 19th to the late 20th century. This book was targeted at cartography students, but was not designed to serve as a stand-alone comprehensive cartography textbook. John P. Snyder, Alan MacEachren, and Michael Goodchild all recommended the book for professional cartographers and cartography students.

Most of Monmonier's work is published by the University of Chicago Press. Geographer Russell S. Kirby stated in a review that his books have "shaped the way we think about maps, their uses, and their abuses, as well as their meanings in the world of business, international politics, and our everyday life."

=== Cartography ===
Monmonier describes himself as an "academic cartographer" in his memoir. His professional work has involved teaching cartography classes and consulting as an expert cartographer with various organizations. His research and publications reflect this specialization, with work focusing on cartographic generalization, thematic maps, and approaches to spatial analysis. He has also written extensively about the history of cartography.

==== Computer cartography ====
Monmonier's early career was dominated by studying and developing techniques in computer cartography. He was one of the early pioneers of research on computer cartography and thematic mapping. His textbook Computer-assisted Cartography: Principles and Prospects was the first textbook on computer cartography, and his 1965 publication The Production of Shaded Maps on the Digital Computer in The Professional Geographer was published six years after Waldo Tobler's 1959 Automation and Cartography, viewed as the first academic publication on using computers in the cartographic process. Several of his publications relate to choropleth maps, including class breaks, intervals, and color choice, as well as recommendations to avoid ink spread.

==== History of cartography ====
Monmonier's research focuses on the twentieth-century history of cartography, in particular, map-related inventions and patents. David Woodward and Brian Harley approached Monmonier as early as the 1970s to discuss his participation in the History of Cartography series. This led to him editing the 6th volume of the series, History of Cartography: Cartography in the Twentieth Century. He has also written about the history of patents related to cartography, and how maps have been used in media. By combining patent records with other information, such as census records, Monmonier published biographic information about several map inventors, notably John Byron Plato, about whom Monmonier published a book.

==== Monmonier Algorithm ====
The "Monmonier Algorithm", an important research tool for geographic studies in linguistics and genetics, is based on an article titled "Maximum-Difference Barriers: An Alternative Numerical Regionalization Method." Monmonier's original article sought to find a "maximum-difference boundary" by assessing how similar or dissimilar counties were with a common border. He demonstrated his algorithm with data from two study areas in the United States, each looking at a different dataset. A 2004 article titled "Geographic patterns of (genetic, morphologic, linguistic) variation: how barriers can be detected by using Monmonier's algorithm", published in the journal Human Biology, built upon this method in a software package, and coined the term "Monmonier Algorithm" to describe it. The 2004 Human Biology journal used Monmonier's 1973 algorithm to identify genetic barriers and visualize the spatial patterns of them, noting that this method works where correlation analyses fails. This has caused Monmonier's 1973 paper to be his most cited peer-reviewed publication.

== Awards and honors ==
Monmonier has received several honors throughout his career. These include:

- In 1984, he received a Guggenheim Fellowship,
- In 2004, the American Association of Geographers awarded him the Globe Book Award for Public Understanding of Geography.
- In 2008, he received the German Cartographic Society's Mercator Medal.
- In 2016, he was inducted into the Urban and Regional Information Systems Association's GIS Hall of fame.
- In 2023, the American Association of Geographers awarded Monmonier the AAG Lifetime Achievement Honors, for making "outstanding contributions to geographic research, most notably in the fields of cartography and geographic communication" as well as an "extensive record of distinctive leadership at national and international levels".

== Personal life ==
Monmonier married Margaret Janet (Kollner) Monmonier in 1965 after meeting her in 1964, and remained married until her death on November 9, 2022. Mark and Margaret adopted their daughter, Jo Kerry, in 1968.

Monmonier is a Catholic, and had his first communion in 1949.

== See also ==
- Cynthia Brewer – American geographer (born 1960)
- Geographers on Film – Archival series of interviews with geographers
- George F. Jenks – American geographer and cartographer
- Mei-Po Kwan – Geographer
- Roger Tomlinson – English-Canadian geographer
- Technical geography – Study of spatial information
