= Canadian Aeronautics and Space Journal =

- Language: English, French
- Edited by: Brendan Quine

Publication details
- History: 1954–present
- Publisher: NRC Research Press (Canada)
- Frequency: Triannual

Standard abbreviations
- ISO 4: Can. Aeronaut. Space J.

Indexing
- ISSN: 0008-2821 (print); 1712-7998 (web)
- OCLC no.: 57918853

Links
- Journal homepage; Online access

Canadian Aeronautics and Space Journal (CASJ, French Journal aéronautique et spatial du Canada) is a triannual peer-reviewed scientific journal covering research on space and aerospace. It is the official journal of the Canadian Aerospace and Space Institute and is published by Scholastica in English. The journal was established in 1954 and the editor-in-chief is Philip Ferguson (University of Manitoba).

== Abstracting and indexing ==
The journal is indexed and abstracted in the following databases:

- AIAA Aerospace and High Technology Database
- Cambridge Scientific Abstracts/Civil Engineering Abstracts
- Cambridge Scientific Abstracts/Mechanical & Transportation Engineering Abstracts
- Ceramic Abstracts
- CISTI Source
- Compendex
- Electronics and Communications Abstracts
- Engineered Materials Abstracts
- International Aerospace Abstracts
- METADEX

== See also ==
- Canadian Journal of Remote Sensing
