= Manfred Buchroithner =

Austrian geologist and cartographer

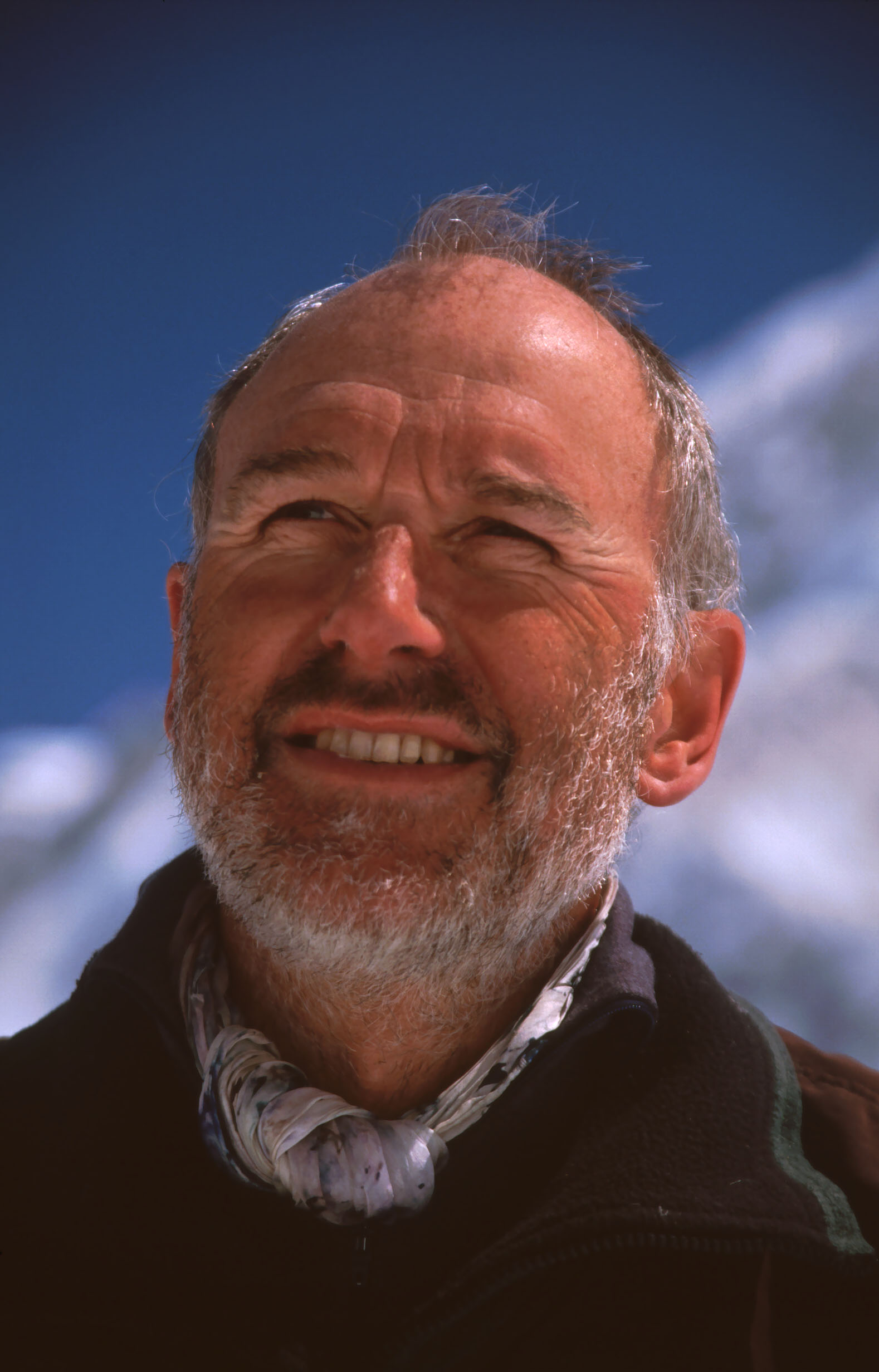
Manfred Buchroithner 2006 at the base of Mount Everest

Manfred Ferdinand Buchroithner (born 17 December 1950 in Wels, Upper Austria) is an Austrian cartographer, developer of autostereoscopic cartographic visualisations, geologist, mountain researcher and mountaineer.

== Biography ==
After finishing college (Ramsauergymnasium) in Linz an der Donau, Austria, in 1969, he did his military service before studying geology and palaeontology as well as mineralogy and petrography at the University of Graz, Austria. In 1976 and 1977 he underwent professional training to become a certified UIAGM mountain guide. The same year he received his PhD in Graz and became research fellow there. In 1979 and 1980 he carried out postdoctoral studies in remote sensing and cartography at the ITC Enschede in the Netherlands. In 1975 he took part in a scientific expedition of several months to the Wakhan Corridor in Afghanistan in 1975 which molded his future career.

In 1980 he took a position at the Cartographic Institute of the Austrian Academy of Sciences in Vienna, Austria, under Erik Arnberger. In 1983 he went as a Fulbright scholar to Fort Worth (Texas), Denver and Boulder (Colorado) as well as to the Stanford University (California). In 1984 he accomplished his habilitation in General Geology and Remote Sensing at the University of Graz. 1984 to 1992 he was employee at, and as from 1985, Head of the Institute of Digital Image Processing and Computer Graphics at Joanneum Research in Graz and taught at the University of Graz, at the Graz University of Technology and at the Stockholm University. From 1992 to 2016 he was holding the position of Full Professor of Cartography at the Dresden University of Technology (Director of Institute for Cartography 1994–1997 and from 2003 until his retirement in 2016).

Manfred Buchroithner is married and has a son and a daughter.

=== Visiting professorships ===
In 1989, he was invited visiting professor at LMU Munich, from 2000 to 2001 and from 2002 to 2003 at the University of Salzburg, Austria, in 2002 at the Center for Energy and Processes (CEP) of the École National Supérieur des Mines de Paris (ENSMP) in Sophia Antipolis, France, in 2015 at the Institute of Information Technology (IIT) of COMSATS in Islamabad, Pakistan, and in 2015/16 at the University of Bergamo, Italy. Högskolan i Gävle (Sweden) WT 2016/17, He followed several invitations to the IIT Kanpur, India.

=== Research focus ===
Major research fields of Buchroithner are true-3D visualization of geoinformation, high-mountain cartography (especially multitemporal 3D glacier mapping using spaceborne remote sensing and AI methods), and remote sensing cartography; furthermore dynamic cartography with remote sensing, geographic information systems, environmental monitoring, multimedia in cartography, as well as epistomology of cartography. In 2006 he initiated the first European (civilian) real-time transmission of true-3D geodata for stereoscopic vision. One of the most spectacular applications of his developments is the linking of a detailed 3D-model and visualization of the mighty Dachstein Southface with climbers' mobile phone GPS data for the support of mountain rescue actions at poor or no visibility. He initiated and led several scientific expeditions to high-alpine areas all over the world. In 1997/98 he produced the first holographic relief map worldwide (with motion-animated labeling) and displayed it at the 1999 International Cartographic Conference (ICC) in Ottawa. His developments in true-3D cartography by means of lenticular foil technology in the late 1990s led to two international patents.

=== Committee work ===
In 1992 Manfred Buchroithner has been appointed as scientific advisor of the Tibetan Mount Everest National Park Qomolangma National Nature Preserve (QNNP). From 1993 to 1997 he was Vice President of the European Association of Remote Sensing Laboratories (EARSeL), where he also chaired a SIG on landslides and mudflows, and from 1999 to 2001 of EURO-STRIM (Association for the Establishment of a European Master and Doctorate in Space Technologies for Risk Management). 2002–2017 Buchroithner is Vice President of the German Cartographic Society (DGfK) International and 2003–2017 German National Delegate to the International Cartographic Association (ICA). In 2011, in his capacity as Chairman of the German Society for the Support of Geodesy and Geoinformation, Buchroithner initiated the Wissenschaftspreis der Deutschen Geodätischen Kommission (DGK-Preis, Science Award of the German Geodetic Commission) for highly qualified postdoctoral researchers. Buchroithner was instrumental in founding three Commissions of the International Cartographic Association (ICA), the Commission on Mountain Cartography (1995), the Commission on Planetary Cartography (1995) and the Commission on Cartography in Early Warning and Crisis Management (2003).

== Achievements in mountaineering ==
Apart from initiating and leading numerous scientific high-mountain expeditions into the ranges of High Asia and the Andes, Buchroithner was also successful as a mountaineer. He made first ascents of Koh-e Asp-e Safed (6101 m, Afghan Pamir, 1975, solo) and Tenzin Gyatso Peak (5984 m, Tibetan Himalaya, south of Karo La, later in Chinese maps indicated as Jitan Zhoma, 6004m, 1992, together with Hans-Dieter Sauer and Bernhard Jüptner). Buchroithner took part at the second ascent of Koh-e Bardar (6078 m, Afghan Pamir, via the challenging North Ridge, with Gernot Patzelt, Heinz Badura and Martin Posch, in 1975, three days after the first ascent by a Polish expedition via the comparatively easy south face). In 1978 he and Rudi Brandstetter opened a new direct route through the East Face of Nevado Rasac (6017 m, Cordillera Huayhuash, Peruvian Andes). In 2005 he opened, together with Martin Rihs and Reinhold Lazar, a new route onto mount Llullaillaco (6,739 m) from southwest.

He climbed, most times solo, several 6000 m and numerous 5000 m peaks in the Andes and in the ranges of High Asia. As a rock climber he opened several new routes in the climbing sites of the Austrian Alps, both south west of Vienna and in the Grazer Bergland. He also soloed numerous rock and mixed routes in the entire Alps, Scandinavia, the Rocky Mountains, the Andes, the HKH Ranges, on Borneo and in New Zealand.

Buchroithner is member of the Österreichischer Alpenklub, a selective Austrian mountaineering club.

== Main Publications ==
Manfred Buchroithner has (co-)authored about 760 scientific publications, which have been cited about 6300 times. His h-index is 36 (status 2022).

=== Books ===
- Remote Sensing. Towards Operational Application; Joanneum Research, Graz, Austria 1987 (coeditor with Robert Kostka, coauthor)
- Die Herstellung der österreichischen Satellitenbildkarten 1:100000 und 1:200000; Verlag der Österreichischen Akademie der Wissenschaften, Vienna 1987
- Fernerkundungskartographie mit Satellitenbilddaten. Band IV/2 der Enzyklopädie der Kartographie und ihrer Randgebiete; Deuticke, Vienna 1989
- Europe. From Sealevel to Alpine Peaks, from Iceland to the Urals; Joanneum Research, Graz 1991 (editor, coautor)
- Applications of Imaging Radar for Hydro-Geological Disaster Management. A Review; Harwood Academic Publ., Amsterdam / Chur 1995 (with Klaus Granica)
- High Mountain Remote Sensing Cartography ; Institute for Cartography, Dresden, Germany 1996 (editor, coautor)
- High Mountain Cartography; Kartographische Bausteine 18; Institute for Cartography, TU Dresden, Dresden 2000 (editor, coautor)
- Remote Sensing for Environmental Data in Albania. A Strategy for Integrated Management; Kluwer Academic Publishers, Dordrecht, Netherlands 2000 (editor)
- Karten und Gletscher; Institut für Kartographie, Dresden 2000 (editor with Wolf Günther Koch and Werner Stams, coautor)
- A Decade of Trans-European Remote Sensing Cooperation; Balkema, Lisse, Netherlands 2001 (editor, coauthor)
- True-3D in Cartography. Autostereoscopic and Solid Visualisation of Geodata. Springer Lecture Notes in Geoinformation and Cartography; Springer, Heidelberg 2012 (editor, coauthor)
- Terrigenous Mass Movements. Detection, Modelling, Early Warning and Mitigation Using Geoinformation Technology; Springer, Heidelberg 2012 (coeditor with Biswajeet Pradhan, coauthor)
- Cartography from Pole to Pole; Springer Lecture Notes in Geoinformation and Cartography; Springer, Heidelberg 2013 (editor with Dirk Burghardt and Nikolas Prechtel, coautor)
- Paradigms in Cartography − An Epistemological Review of the 20th and 21st Centuries; Springer, Heidelberg 2014 (coautor with Pablo Iván Azócar Fernández)
- Benjamin Schröter, Manfred Buchroithner, Uta Heidig (June 2017). "Unbounded Mapping of Mountains" (PDF). mountaincartography.org. TU Dresden.
- Lademann, J.-H., Schubert, F. & Buchroithner, M.F. (2017), De Piedras y Montanas: Geologia del Maule (in German), Talca: Fundación Trekking Chile & Universidad Editorial de Talca, p. 116
- Manfred Buchroithner (2019), "Rohstoffe in der Wüste: Neue Technologien für die Prospektion", in Markus Eisl, Gerald Mansberger (ed.), WÜSTEN: Lebensraum der Extreme, Edition Human Footprint (in German), Salzburg: eoVision GmbH, 2019, pp. 196–197(255 pages), ISBN 978-3-902834-28-7

=== Films ===
- Geowissenschaftliche Anwendung von Satellitenbilddaten; 1982 (with Lothar Beckel)
- Radar Stereo Mapping from Space; 1988 (with Hannes Raggam and Gerhard Triebnig)
- Das Loch im Stein; 1999 (with Dieter Berger; English: Hole in the Stone, 2000)
- Routensucher in der Atacama; 2005 (with Dieter Berger)
- Zwischen Gobi und Himalaja. Über das kartographische Werk von Sven Hedin; 2006 (with Antje Oppitz and Dieter Berger)
- Einsatz in der Südwand. Die neue Dimension der Bergrettung; 2011 (with Thomas Hillebrandt)

=== Maps ===
Due to his expertise both in mountaineering and cartography Buchroithner contributed to a number of Alpine Club maps that are published jointly by the Austrian and the German Alpine Club resp. was assigned responsibility for content and/or production. Equally he contributed to maps of the Arbeitsgemeinschaft für vergleichende Hochgebirgsforschung. Examples include:

==== Alpine Club Maps ====
- AV-Kartenblatt 0/6: Pamir-e Wakhan, Dardistan (1975)
- AV-Kartenblatt Nr. 0/13: Nevado Ojos del Salado (2004)
- AV-Kartenblatt 0/14: Inylchek, Tien Shan/Kyrgyzstan (2008)
- AV-Kartenblatt 0/15: Khan Tengri, Tien Shan/Kyrgyzstan (2008)
- AV-Kartenblatt Nr. 51: Brentagruppe (Brenta group, 2011)

==== ARGE Maps ====
- Ecuador 1: Orthophotokarte Nevado Chimborazo (1997, ISBN 978-3-86780-141-6)
- Karte Brentagruppe 1:15.000 – Sonderausgabe anlässlich 100 Jahre Alpenvereinskarte mit Gletscherständen der Erstausgabe (2010, ISBN 978-3-86780-142-3)
- Nepal-Kartenwerk 2: Khumbu Himal (2013, ISBN 978-3-86780-333-5)
- Nepal-Kartenwerk 5: Shorong / Hinku (2013, ISBN 978-3-86780-334-2)
- Nepal-Kartenwerk 11:Kailash, Gurla Mandhata (2014, ISBN 978-3-86780-408-0)
- Ecuador 2: Orthophotokarte Cotopaxi (2015, ISBN 978-3-86780-440-0)
- Kilimanjaro. Physiographic Map with Landuse and Vegetation. Scale 1:100,000. (2017, ISBN 978-3-9816552-3-0)

== Patents ==
- 2004: Topographic map (facilitating the three-dimensional perception; with Thomas Gründemann and Klaus Habermann); DE 10 2004 060 069; international 2006: WO 2006/061014
- 2004: Topographic map that can be visually perceived in a three-dimensional manner (with Thomas Gründemann and Klaus Habermann); DE 10 2004 060 070; international 2006: WO 2006/061015; United States 2009: US 2009/0104588
- 2013: Method and assembly for locating and rescuing people (with Guido Ehlert, Bernd Hetze, Horst Kohlschmidt, Nikolas Prechtel); EP 13158991.3-1812

== Accomplishments ==
(Selection)

- 1970–1975: Two times Outstanding Students Stipend by the Austrian Federal Government
- 1979: Austrian Theodor Körner Prize for the Promotion of Arts and Sciences
- 1982: Jungwissenschaftlerpreis (junior scientists' award) of the State of Upper Austria
- since 1992: Full Member of the Deutsche Geodätische Kommission (German Geodetic Commission, DGK) of the Bavarian Academy of Sciences and Humanities.
- 1994: Honorary conferment of the title Europa Ingenieur through FEANI Brussels
- ICA Map Awards: four times (2 × 1999, 2001, 2003) first place (Best Map Award "Excellence in Cartography"); one time second place (2013)
- 2004: Best Poster Award at the 20th ISPRS Congress in Istanbul
- since 2004: Full Member; since 2009 member of the Board of Scientific Advisors and since 2013 Executive Member (Vice Chairman) of Arbeitsgemeinschaft für vergleichende Hochgebirgsforschung e. V. (Association for Comparative High Mountain Research)
- 2006: HMRSC Award of the HMRSC Group of the International Cartographic Association (ICA)
- 2006: Award of Appreciation of the FIG / Arab Ligue of Surveyors
- 2010: Friedrich Hopfner Medal of the Austrian Geodetic Commission for his achievements in high mountain cartography
- 2013: ICA Diploma for Outstanding Services
- 2014: Kudos Certificate of DGfK
- since 2017: member of the Editorial Board of Austria-Forum
- 2018: Silver medal of Honour of the DGfK
- 2018: Denny Medal of IMarEST, jointly with Martin Kada and Emil Bayramov
