= Technological Transition in Cartography =

1985 book by Mark Monmonier

- Author: Mark Monmonier
- Language: English
- Subject: Cartography
- Publisher: University of Wisconsin Press
- Publication date: 1985
- Publication place: United States
- Media type: Print
- Pages: 304
- ISBN: 9780299100704
- Text: Technological Transition in Cartography online

Technological Transition in Cartography is a seminal book by Mark Monmonier, first published in 1985. The book explores the impact of technological advancements on the evolution of the field of cartography, examining how innovations in technology have transformed the methods and practices of mapmaking. The book was created to target cartography students of the time, and sought to demonstrate the importance of viewing cartography as a method of delivering geographic information, rather than using the technology.

== Overview ==
Technological Transition in Cartography was published in 1984 by the University of Wisconsin Press. In Technological Transition in Cartography, Monmonier provides an analysis of the technological changes that have occurred in cartography from the 19th to the late 20th century. It is not a textbook and does not offer a comprehensive overview of cartography, its history, or a review of the technology, but instead focuses on explaining the impact of technological change on cartography. One reviewer noted that Monmonier described the book as "in part a cursory technological history and in part a philosophical essay on the evolution of maps, map information, and map use."

The book has seven chapters, an introduction and conclusion, and the remaining five broken into five sections: "location and navigation", "boundaries and surveys", "aerial reconnaissance and land cover inventories", "decision support systems", and "map publishing and the digital map." In addition to these, the text has a short preference, notes, a bibliography, and glossary. The book has eighty seven figures.

== Impact and Reception ==
In a later talk and publication discussing Technological Transition in Cartography Monmonoier stated that the book would likely be considered a "commercial failure" by publishers, having sold less than 1,200 copies in addition to 200 publications that were given away by the publisher by 1995. Despite this, upon its release, Technological Transition in Cartography mainly received positive reviews regarding its coverage of technological advancements in cartography. Reviewers praised Monmonier's ability to contextualize complex technological changes within the broader history of cartography. John P. Snyder stated in his review "the book is highly recommended as a well-written, concise, accurate, and pertinent story of a complicated field in clearly described terms for both lay and professional individuals and organizations." Michael Goodchild stated the book was well written and recommended it for professional cartographers and students. Alan MacEachren stated that the book "belongs in every cartographer's library."

Multiple reviewers noted that the book had an emphasis on military technology. One reviewer noted that military funding drives a lot of cartographic innovation regardless of if we "like it or not," and Michael Goodchild's echoed this sentiment in his review. Snyder stated in his review that Monmonier may have overemphasized military contributions to cartography over commercial. Goodchild's review states that Monmonier noted a manuscript reviewer believed his coverage of military innovation was "uncomfortably enthusiastic," and while he believes that Monmonier handled this issue well, it resulted in an "awkward compromise."

Snyder pointed out minor errors, including the temporal resolution of Landsat and an equation on one page. Valerian Noronha criticized the book's visual presentation, specifically noting the "dull Tektronix-green dustjacket," illustrations, and lack of color. The lack of content on specific topics was noted by reviewers, with one pointing out it lacked discussion on "map perception, psychophysics, cognition, or models of communication." Noronha criticized the book's lack of coverage in theoretical cartography, specifically "smoothing, Fourier analysis, and fractal geometry." C. Peter Keller stated that Monmoneier's argument for emphasizing computer cartography over pen and paper drafting in coursework was poorly explained. Goodchild pointed out that the subject matter was risky, as novel technology in mapping could quickly become irrelevant.

The book struggled partly because it lacked a specific traditional niche, with Noronha stating it could be seen as an advertisement for cartography, targeting clients. Reviewers noted that the book was not a traditional textbook, lacking a comprehensive review of the technology, and was too broad for introduction to cartography courses while being targeted towards undergraduate students. Geographers Keller, Terry Slocum, and James Carter all stated the book could be used in an advanced cartography course or to inspire research, but believed students in introductory courses might not appreciate the content.

An excerpt from the book was published in 1996, and later included as a chapter in the book The Map Reader: Theories of Mapping Practice and Cartographic Representation, which published texts and excerpts considered to be "significant" to cartography that had appeared in peer-reviewed journals and scholarly monographs.

== Author ==
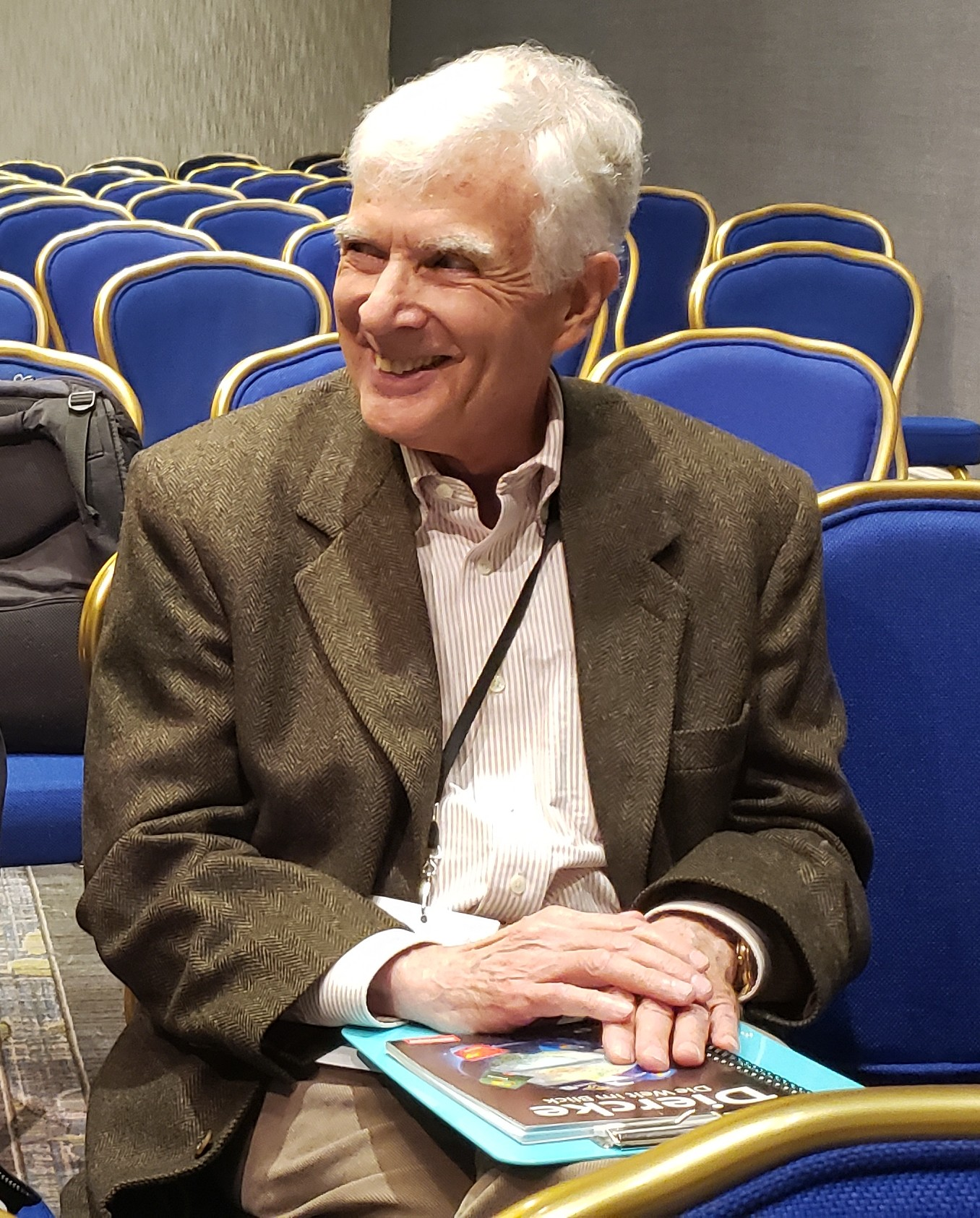
Mark Monmonier at American Association of Geographers 2019 annual conference

Mark Monmonier is a geography professor at the Maxwell School of Citizenship and Public Affairs at Syracuse University. He has published several books on cartography and maps aimed at professionals and the general public, with the most notable being How to Lie with Maps. In 1985, the year Technological Transition in Cartography was published, Monmonier resigned as Editor of The American Cartographer due to disagreements regarding, "the importance to the profession of federal personnel qualifications standards which recognize the value of a comprehensive cartographic education to those accepting the title and responsibilities of Cartographer." The American Association of Geographers awarded him a lifetime achievement award in 2023, noting his significant contributions to geographic communication and cartography.

== See also ==
- Concepts and Techniques in Modern Geography – Series of geography texts, 1975–1996
- Critical cartography – Mapping practices and methods of analysis grounded in critical theory
- Geographia Generalis – Geography textbook by Bernhardus Varenius
- Scientific Geography Series – Series of geography publications, 1985–1988
- Theoretical Geography – 1962 book by William Bunge
