= How to Lie with Maps =

1991 book by Mark Monmonier

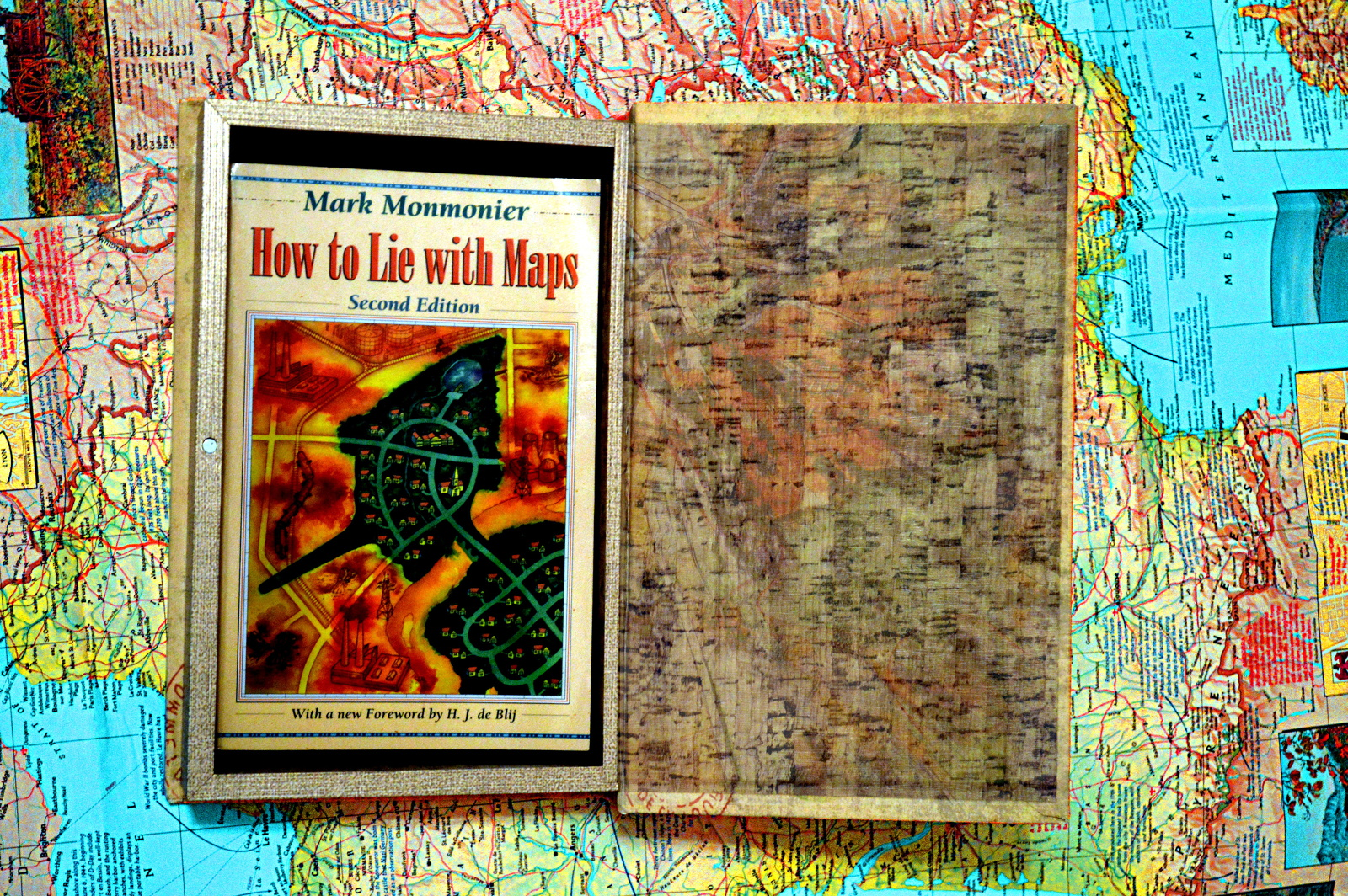
- How to Lie with Maps, 2nd edition
- Author: Mark Monmonier
- Language: English
- Subject: Cartography
- Publisher: University of Chicago Press
- Publication date: 1991
- Publication place: United States
- Media type: Print
- Pages: 252
- ISBN: 9780226436081

How to Lie with Maps is a nonfiction book written by Mark Monmonier detailing issues with cartographic representation and targeted at the general public. First published in 1991 by the University of Chicago Press, it explores the various ways in which maps can be manipulated and how these distortions influence the general public's perceptions and understanding of the world. The book highlights the subjectivity involved in map-making and the potential for misuse of cartographic techniques, with a goal to "promote a healthy skepticism about maps."

== Overview ==
The first edition of How to Lie with Maps was published in 1991. The title was inspired by How to Lie with Statistics by Darrell Huff, which Monmonier referred to as one of his favorite books and used as supplemental reading in an "Information Graphics" course. How to Lie with Maps is written in casual prose and contains humor aimed at keeping non-professionals engaged while discussing technical concepts. It contains 10 chapters and an epilogue, starting with cartographic basics and covering symbolization, scale, distortion, and specific map applications like advertising and propaganda. Monmonier explores how symbols and color can mislead viewers, highlighting the importance of symbolization in map-making, with particular attention to choropleth maps and how they can be misleading. The book analyzes the distortions introduced by various map projections and coordinate systems, providing a critical look at how these technical choices impact the representation of geographical data. Additionally, it investigates how maps have been used for propaganda, illustrating cartography's persuasive power. Finally, How to Lie with Maps addresses the ethical responsibilities of cartographers, encouraging a reflection on the ethical considerations involved in creating and interpreting maps. Through these discussions, Monmonier encourages readers to develop a critical eye when analyzing maps, understanding that no map can be completely objective.

A second edition, updated with new examples and discussions of digital cartography, was released in 1996. This edition added two added chapters, chapter 9 "Large-Scale Mapping, Culture, and the National Interest", and chapter 12 "Multimedia, Experiential Maps, and Graphic Scripts".

In 2018, a third edition was published, reflecting advancements in geographic information systems (GIS) and the increasing prevalence of digital maps. The third edition included a new preference, and replaced the chapter 12 in the second edition with three new chapters: chapter 12, "Image Maps: Picture That"; chapter 13, "Prohibitive Cartography: Maps That Say 'No!'"; and chapter 14, "Fast Maps: Animated, Interactive, or Mobile". In the third edition, discussion on color moved from later in the book to chapter 5, and additional minor corrections were made.

== Impact and reception ==
How to Lie with Maps has been widely acclaimed for its insightful and accessible treatment of a complex subject, and is considered a classic in cartographic literature. It has been referred to as a "bible for cartographers" by Steven Bernard of the Financial Times, and "the closest thing to a religious text we have in cartography" in Spatial Literacy in Public Health: Faculty-Librarian Teaching Collaborations. The book has been used as assigned reading in classrooms, and translated into Chinese, Czech, French, German, Japanese, Korean, Russian and Spanish, and has had a global impact on cartographic research. The book is praised for making the technical aspects of map-making understandable to a general audience while highlighting the importance of critical thinking when interpreting maps. The magazine Geographical listed How to Lie with Maps as one of the "Eight essential books for geographers" in 2020.

Across the various editions, there are several consistent criticisms of the work. Examples are dated and include references to the Soviet Union, even in the 3rd edition, when more contemporary examples may have worked, and statistics reviewers considered dated in the 1st edition were still included in the 3rd. The figures are often difficult to read, and several criticized in the 1st edition were not replaced in later editions. While chapters added to later editions are considered to have improved the work, one reviewer stated that they thought the original chapters "still need a new coat of paint."

== Author ==
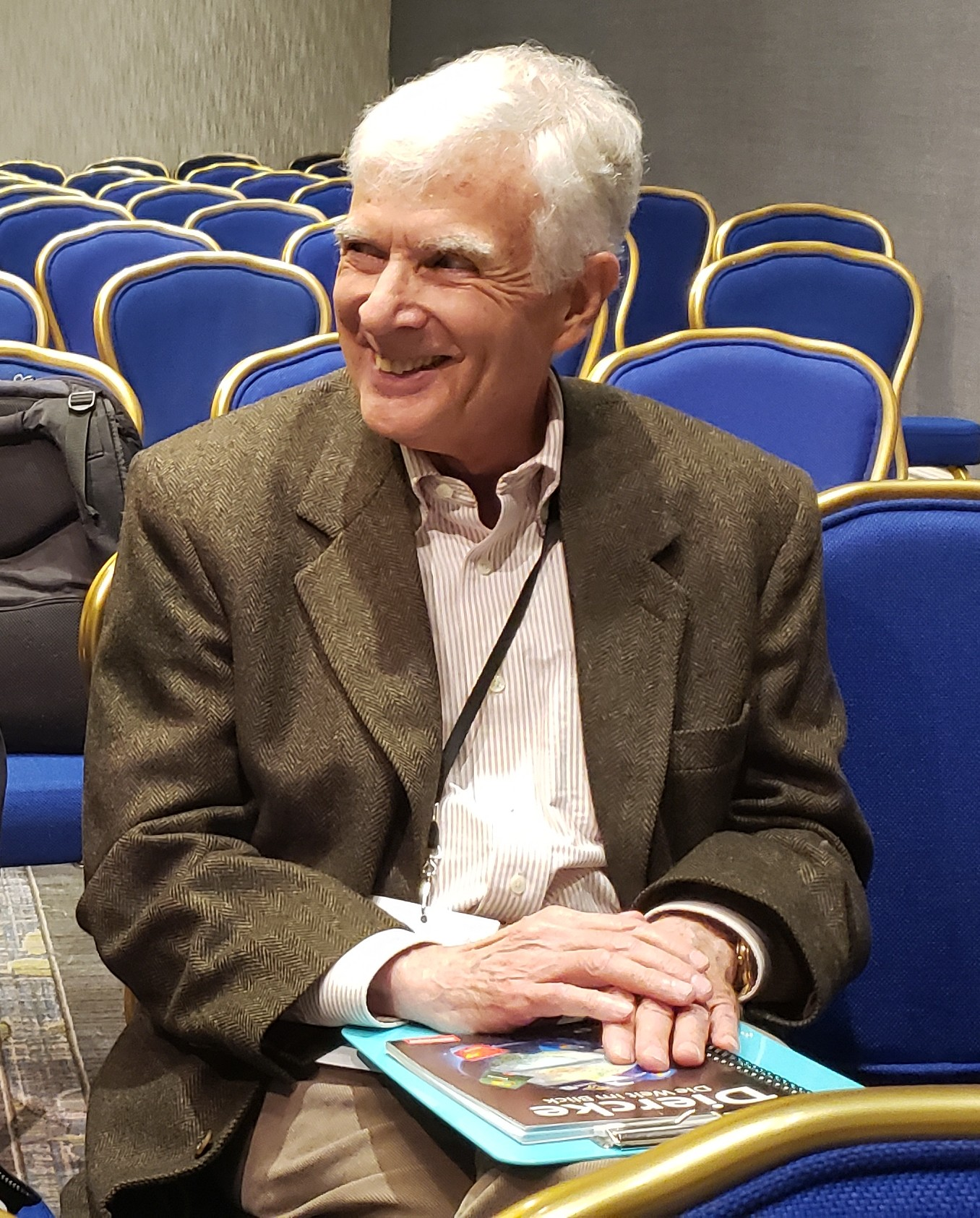
Mark Monmonier at American Association of Geographers 2019 annual conference

Mark Monmonier began working at the Maxwell School of Citizenship and Public Affairs at Syracuse University in 1973 as a professor, where he published all three editions of How to Lie with Maps.. By the time he wrote How to Lie with Maps, Mark Monmonier had been publishing on similar topics for several years, including the 1988 book Maps with the News, and peer-reviewed publications covered the topic of cartographic inaccuracies. The American Association of Geographers awarded him a lifetime achievement award in 2023, noting his significant contributions to geographic communication and cartography, listing How to Lie with Maps among the examples of these contributions.

== See also ==
- Concepts and Techniques in Modern Geography – Series of geography texts, 1975–1996
- Critical cartography – Mapping practices and methods of analysis grounded in critical theory
- Geographia Generalis – Geography textbook by Bernhardus Varenius
- Mark Monmonier bibliography – Geographer Mark Monmonier's publications
- Modifiable areal unit problem – Source of statistical bias
- Scientific Geography Series – Series of geography publications, 1985–1988
- Technical geography – Study of spatial information
- Technological Transition in Cartography – 1985 book by Mark Monmonier
