= Computer cartography =

Compiling data to create a visual image

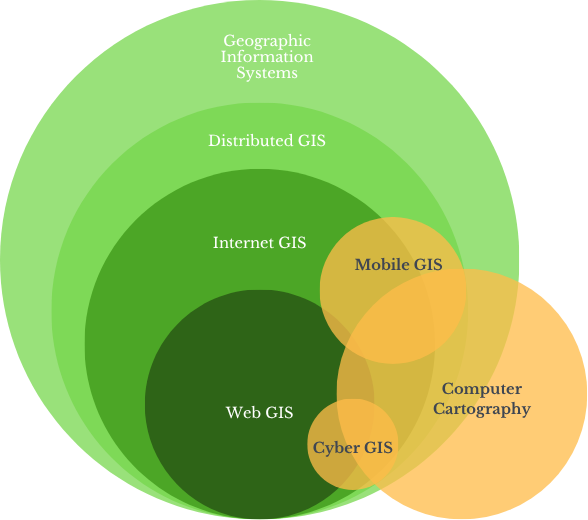
Relationship between general GIS, distributed GIS, Internet GIS, Web GIS, Mobile GIS, Cyber GIS, and computer cartography.

Example of a digital map. Pictured is percentage of Australian population that identifies as Anglican.

Computer cartography (also called digital cartography) is the art, science, and technology of making and using maps with a computer. This technology represents a paradigm shift in how maps are produced, but is still fundamentally a subset of traditional cartography. The primary function of this technology is to produce maps, including creation of accurate representations of a particular area such as, detailing major road arteries and other points of interest for navigation, and in the creation of thematic maps. Computer cartography is one of the main functions of geographic information systems (GIS), however, GIS is not necessary to facilitate computer cartography and has functions beyond just making maps. The first peer-reviewed publications on using computers to help in the cartographic process predate the introduction of full GIS by several years.

Computer cartography is employed to facilitate a variety of computer applications, often through integration with the Global Positioning System (GPS) satellite network. This can allow real-time automated map generation for tasks such as automotive navigation systems.

== History ==
=== From paper to paperless ===
In the 1959, Waldo Tobler published a paper titled "Automation and Cartography" that established the first use case for computers as aids in cartography. In this paper, Tobler established what he referred to as a "map in–map out" (MIMO) system, which facilitated digitization of traditional maps, changing them, and reproducing them. The MIMO system, while simple, established the use of computers for map making in the literature and set the stage for more advanced geographic information systems in later years by geographers such as Roger Tomlinson. The rapid acceleration that followed lead to a rapid paradigm shift in cartography, where traditional cartography was replaced by computer-aided cartography. This was predicted in 1985, when Mark Monmonier speculated in his book Technological Transition in Cartography that computer cartography facilitated by GIS would largely replace traditional pen and paper cartography. It is believed that the milestone of more maps created and distributed with computers was achieved sometime in the mid-1990s.

=== Expanded capabilities ===
Early digital maps had the same basic functionality as paper maps—that is, they provided a "virtual view" of roads generally outlined by the terrain encompassing the surrounding area. However, as digital maps have grown with the expansion of GPS technology in the past decade, live traffic updates, points of interest and service locations have been added to enhance digital maps to be more "user conscious". Traditional "virtual views" are now only part of digital mapping. In many cases, users can choose between virtual maps, satellite (aerial views), and hybrid (a combination of virtual map and aerial views) views. With the ability to update and expand digital mapping devices, newly constructed roads and places can be added to appear on maps. Three-dimensional maps of landscapes can be generated using 3D scanners or 3D reconstruction software.

== Data collection ==
Digital maps heavily rely upon a vast amount of data collected over time. Most of the information that comprise digital maps is the culmination of satellite imagery as well as street level information. Maps must be updated frequently to provide users with the most accurate reflection of a location. While there is a wide spectrum on companies that specialize in digital mapping, the basic premise is that digital maps will accurately portray roads as they actually appear to give "life-like experiences".

== Functionality and use ==
=== Computer applications ===
Proprietary and non-proprietary computer programs and applications provide imagery and street-level map data for much of the world.

=== Scientific applications ===
The development of mobile computing (PDAs, tablet PCs, laptops, etc.) has recently (since about 2000) spurred the use of digital mapping in the sciences and applied sciences. As of 2009, science fields that use digital mapping technology include geology (see Digital geological mapping), engineering, architecture, land surveying, mining, forestry, environmental, and archaeology.

=== GPS navigation systems ===
The principal use by which digital mapping has grown in the past decade has been its connection to Global Positioning System (GPS) technology. GPS is the foundation behind digital mapping navigation systems.

==== How it works ====
The coordinates and position as well as atomic time obtained by a terrestrial GPS receiver from GPS satellites orbiting Earth interact together to provide the digital mapping programming with points of origin in addition to the destination points needed to calculate distance. This information is then analyzed and compiled to create a map that provides the easiest and most efficient way to reach a destination.

More technically speaking, the device operates in the following manner:

1. GPS receivers collect data from at least four GPS satellites orbiting the Earth, calculating position in three dimensions.
2. The GPS receiver then utilizes position to provide GPS coordinates, or exact points of latitudinal and longitudinal direction from GPS satellites.
3. The points, or coordinates, output an accurate range between approximately "10-20 meters" of the actual location.
4. The beginning point, entered via GPS coordinates, and the ending point, (address or coordinates) input by the user, are then entered into the digital mapping software.
5. The mapping software outputs a real-time visual representation of the route. The map then moves along the path of the driver.
6. If the driver drifts from the designated route, the navigation system will use the current coordinates to recalculate a route to the destination location.

== See also ==
- Cartography
- Digital elevation model
- Geographic information systems
- Geographic information system software
- Digital architecture
- Digital geological mapping
- Simultaneous localization and mapping
- Sound map
