= Canadian Cartographic Association =

Canadian non-profit organization

- Abbreviation: CCA
- Formation: October 18, 1975
- Type: NGO
- Location: Canada
- Affiliations: International Cartographic Association
- Website: cca-acc.org

The Canadian Cartographic Association (CCA; French: Association cartographique canadienne - ACC) is a non-profit association devoted to promoting promote the disciplines and professions of cartography and Geographic Information Science in Canada. The organization was established in 1975 by cartographic professionals that came together in Ottawa to discuss a report that favored the formation of a professional Association dedicated to promoting Cartography. This inaugural meeting sponsored by the Resources Mapping Division of Environment Canada, led to the formation of the CCA.

The CCA plays a leading role in the world of cartography through involvement with the International Cartographic Association and the published international journal for geographic information and geovisualization known as Cartographica. The CCA also publishes an annual newsletter, CCA Cartouche, which includes news about conferences and events, updates by the executive committee, and member submitted articles, available in both print and digital formats.

The CCA hosts an annual conference, in alternating regions across Canada, as well as various regional member events. The CCA has four Special Interest Groups that cater to members with interests in particular branches of cartography and serving as the focus for special sessions at the annual conference: Mapping Technologies & Spatial Data, History of Cartography, Education, and Geovisualization and Map Design.

Membership is open to anyone with an interest in any aspect of mapping. Members are located all across Canada and are drawn from the ranks of government, industry, and education, and from the general public.
The CCA awards annual Canadian Cartographic Association Awards of Distinction to recognize individuals or groups who have made exceptional contributions in the field of cartography, including Exceptional Contributions to the CCA Award, Exceptional Scholarly Contributions to Cartography Award, and Exceptional Professional Contributions to the Practice of Cartography Award. The CCA also awards student prizes and scholarships, including the Norman L. Nicholson Memorial Scholarship, President’s Prize Competition, Carto-Québec Prize, CCA Web Map Award, and Best Student Paper/Presentation Prize.

== Leadership ==
- 1975 – Janusz Klawe
- 1976 – Gerald McGrath
- 1977 – Leonard Guelke
- 1978, 1979 – D. R. Fraser Taylor
- 1980 – Raymond Boyle
- 1981 – Henry Castner
- 1982 – Michael Coulson
- 1983 – David Douglas
- 1984 – Michel Rheault
- 1985 – Clifford H. Wood
- 1986 – Malcolm Brown
- 1987 – Christopher Gold
- 1988 – Norman Drummond
- 1989 – Jean Carriere
- 1990 – Claudette LeBlanc
- 1991 – Peter Keller
- 1992 – Majella Gauthier
- 1993 – Alun Hughes
- 1994 – Marcia Faurer
- 1995 – Janet Mersey
- 1996 – Gary McManus
- 1997 – Brian Klinkenberg
- 1998 – Roger Wheate
- 1999 – Michel Fournier
- 2000, 2001 – Patricia Connor
- 2002 – Ute Dymon
- 2003 – Claire Gosson
- 2004 – Christine Earl
- 2005 – Rick Gray
- 2006 – Clifford H. Wood
- 2007 – James Boxall
- 2008 – Clifford H. Wood
- 2009 – Daniel G. Cole
- 2010 – Donna Williams
- 2011 – Gerald Stark
- 2012, 2013 – Anna Jasiak
- 2014, 2015 – Chris Storie
- 2016, 2017 – Julia Siemer
- 2018, 2019 – Monica Lloyd
- 2020, 2021 – Ted MacKinnon
- 2022 – Glenn Brauen

== See also ==
- Canadian Remote Sensing Society
