= Canadian Remote Sensing Society =

- Type: NGO
- Website: crss-sct.ca

The Canadian Remote Sensing Society (CRSC) is a learned society devoted to remote sensing in Canada. CRSC publishes the Canadian Journal of Remote Sensing.

== See also ==
- Canadian Cartography Association
