= Canadian Journal of Remote Sensing =

- Discipline: Remote sensing
- Language: English
- Edited by: Monique Bernier

Publication details
- Publisher: Taylor & Francis
- Impact factor: 2.000 (2020)

Standard abbreviations
- ISO 4: Can. J. Remote Sens.

Indexing
- ISSN: 0703-8992 (print); 1712-7971 (web)

Links
- Journal homepage

The Canadian Journal of Remote Sensing (French: Journal canadien de télédétection) is an academic journal about remote sensing published by Taylor & Francis on behalf of the Canadian Remote Sensing Society and the Canadian Aeronautics and Space Institute. Its editor-in-chief is Monique Bernier; its 2020 impact factor is 2.000.

== See also ==
- Cartographica
