= The Professional Geographer =

- Discipline: Geography
- Language: English
- Edited by: Heejun Chang

Publication details
- History: 1949-present
- Publisher: Routledge on behalf of the Association of American Geographers (United States)
- Frequency: Quarterly
- Impact factor: 2.411 (2021)

Standard abbreviations
- ISO 4: Prof. Geogr.

Indexing
- CODEN: PFGGAC
- ISSN: 0033-0124 (print); 1467-9272 (web)
- LCCN: 52048680
- OCLC no.: 311148488

Links
- Journal homepage; Online access; Online archive

The Professional Geographer is a quarterly peer-reviewed academic journal publishing short articles on all aspects of geography. The journal is published by Taylor and Francis on behalf of the American Association of Geographers. According to the Journal Citation Reports, the journal has a 2021 impact factor of 2.411, ranking it 46th out of 85 journals in the category "Geography".

Every year, the journal publishes a special section with papers that were finalists for the J. Warren Nystrom Award, given to the best paper based upon a recent dissertation in geography.

== Abstracting and indexing ==
The journal is abstracted and indexed in:

- Academic ASAP
- Bibliography and Index of Geology
- Current Contents/Social & Behavioral Science
- EBSCO databases
- Environmental Sciences & Pollution Management
- GEOBASE
- GeoRef
- InfoTrac OneFile
- International Bibliography of the Social Sciences
- Meteorological & Geoastrophysical Abstracts
- Social Sciences Citation Index
