= Cartographica =

- Discipline: Geography, Cartography
- Language: English
- Edited by: Emmanuel Stefanakis

Publication details
- History: 1964-present
- Publisher: University of Toronto Press on behalf of the Canadian Cartographic Association (Canada)
- Frequency: Quarterly

Standard abbreviations
- ISO 4: Cartographica

Indexing
- ISSN: 0317-7173 (print); 1911-9925 (web)

Links
- Journal homepage

The Cartographica is the official publication of the Canadian Cartographic Association, in affiliation with the International Cartographic Association. Cartographica is published four times a year by the University of Toronto Press.
The journal was first published in 1965 as The Cartographer, was renamed The Canadian Cartographer in 1968 and was renamed Cartographica in 1980. It is an international and interdisciplinary peer-reviewed academic journal that publishes transformative research, education, and practice contributions to the social, political, technological, and historical aspects of cartography and geovisualization.

== Abstracting and indexing ==
The journal is abstracted and indexed in:

- Academic Search Alumni Edition
- Academic Search Complete
- Academic Search Elite
- Academic Search Premier
- Canadian Reference Centre
- Emerging Sources Citation Index (ESCI)
- Microsoft Academic Search
- Scopus
- Ulrich's Periodicals Directory
