= German Cartographic Society =

- Native name: Deutsche Gesellschaft für Kartographie
- Founded: July 9, 1951 in Bielefeld
- Headquarters: Hanover
- Key people: Jochen Schiewe (chairman)
- Number of employees: about 2000

The German Cartographic Society e.V. (German: Deutsche Gesellschaft für Kartographie e.V. (DGfK)) is a professional society of cartography professionals and those interested in cartographic products. It currently has about 2000 members. President of the DGfK since 2019 is Jochen Schiewe.

== Targets ==
The purpose of the association includes the following objectives:

- Promotion of cartography in research, teaching and practice
- Support of all those working in cartographic professions through education, training and continuing education, especially of the young professionals
- Fostering of national and international cooperation in cartography and with other disciplines
- Promotion of scientific knowledge for spatially significant planning and measures
- Supporting the maintenance of the cartographic cultural heritage in Germany

== Organization ==
The elected Board of Directors, chaired by the President, conducts the business of the Society. With the Board of Directors, the Society has an advisory body that contributes technical and structural aspects to the work of the Society.

The DGfK is regionally subdivided into 16 sections, which offer events, lectures, excursions, etc. to their members and guests in the respective region.

For the professional work the association has established commissions. They are each dedicated to one topic and correspond in their structure partly to the commissions of the International Cartographic Association (ICA), with which intensive cooperation exists. At present (2011) there are the following commissions:

- 3D City Models
- Applied cartography and geo-visualization
- Atlas Cartography
- Education and training
- History of cartography
- High mountain cartography
- Map curators
- Cartography and research
- Law and cartography
- School and cartography

== Publications ==
As a joint organ of the DGfK, the Swiss Cartographic Society and the Austrian Cartographic Commission in the Austrian Geographic Society, the Cartographic news (German: Kartographische Nachrichten (KN)) – journal for geoinformation and visualization – is published. At intervals of two to three years, the approximately 350-page Cartographic Handbook (German: Kartographische Taschenbuch (KT)) is published with basic technical articles, addresses of organizations, research institutions, companies and much more on cartography and geoinformation. The Cartographic Writings (German: Kartographische Schriften (KS)) are dedicated to main topics of cartography, special events and the scientific documentation of symposia and workshops.

The Remarkable Map (German: Bemerkenswerte Karte) is an initiative of the DGfK that has existed since 2012. It reports monthly in a blog about cartographic works that are remarkable in its opinion.

== Awards ==
With the award of the Mercator Medal named after Gerhard Mercator, the DGfK honors personalities who have rendered extraordinary services to cartography through internationally recognized scientific achievements.
