= Progress in Human Geography =

- Discipline: Human geography
- Language: English
- Edited by: Noel Castree

Publication details
- History: 1977-present
- Publisher: SAGE Publications
- Frequency: Bimonthly
- Impact factor: 5.010 (2014)

Standard abbreviations
- ISO 4: Prog. Hum. Geogr.

Indexing
- ISSN: 0309-1325 (print); 1477-0288 (web)
- LCCN: 77644605
- OCLC no.: 224488118

Links
- Journal homepage; Online access; Online archive

Progress in Human Geography is a bimonthly peer-reviewed academic journal that covers the field of human geography, primarily publishing critical reviews of current research. The journal's editor-in-chief is Noel Castree. It was established in 1977 at Edward Arnold and is currently published by SAGE Publications.

== Abstracting and indexing ==
Progress in Human Geography is abstracted and indexed in Scopus and the Social Sciences Citation Index. According to the Journal Citation Reports, its 2014 impact factor is 5.010, ranking it 2 out of 73 journals in the category "Geography".
