= Geographia Generalis =

Geography textbook by Bernhardus Varenius

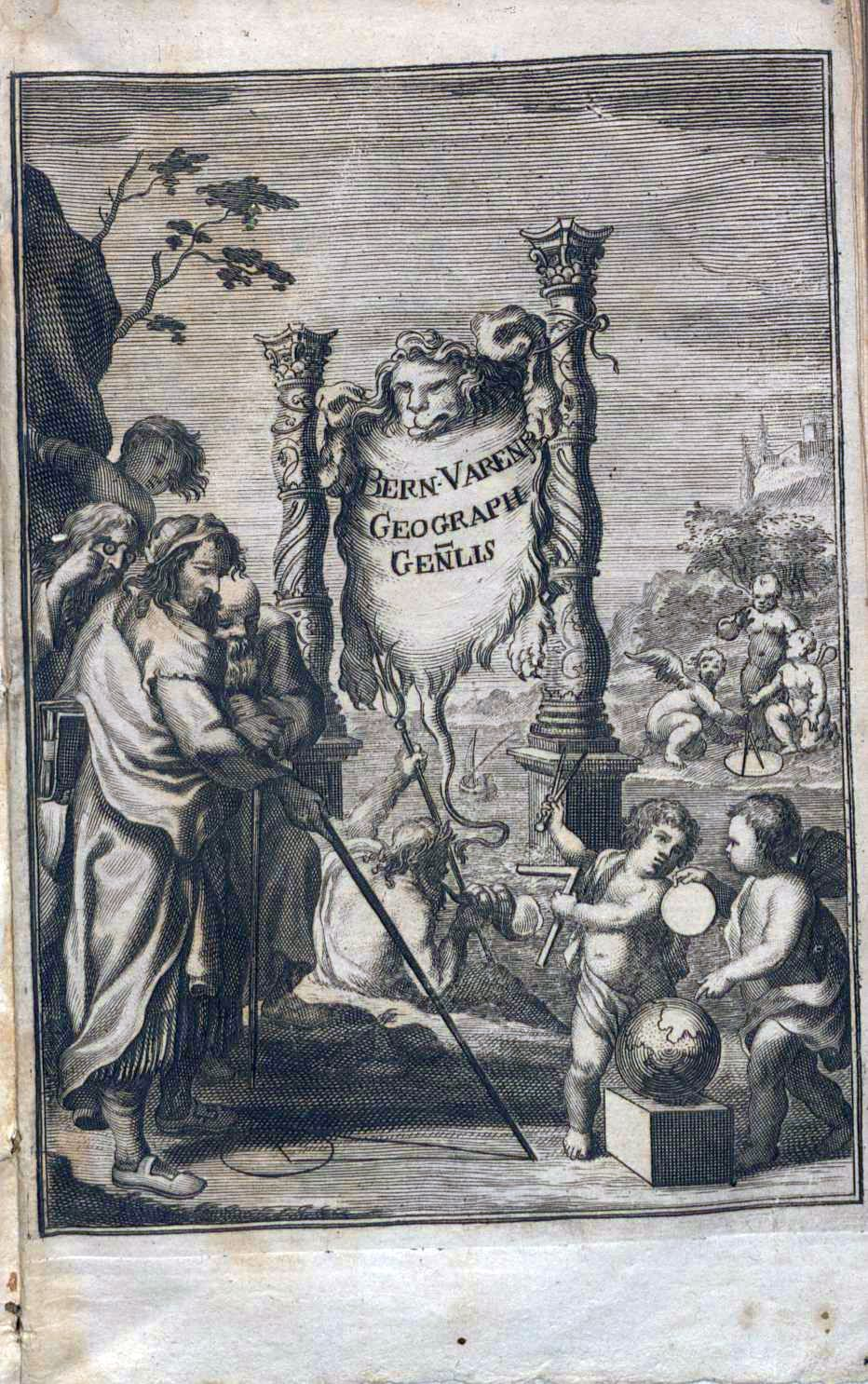
- Geographia generalis
- Author: Bernhardus Varenius
- Translator: Richard Blome, James Jurin
- Publisher: Elzevir press, Cambridge University Press
- Publication date: 1650
- English publication date: 1682, 1721

Geographia Generalis is a seminal work in the field of geography authored by Bernhardus Varenius, first published in 1650. This influential text laid the foundations for modern geographical science and was pivotal in the development of geography as a scientific discipline. Geographer Fred Lukermann described Geographia Generalis as the division between medieval geography and modern geography.

== Background ==
Varenius was deeply influenced by the works of classical geographers such as Claudius Ptolemy and Strabo. Ptolemy's Geographia was particularly significant, as it provided a framework for mapping the known world using a coordinate system based on latitude and longitude, and the title of Geographia Generalis intentionally linked it to Ptolemy's text. Varenius aimed to build upon these classical foundations, integrating new discoveries and scientific principles, to create a theoretical foundation. Varenius considered geography to be a cross between science and pure mathematics, applied to quantifying things about the Earth. By applying mathematical principles and a systematic approach, he sought to demonstrate that geography could be studied with the same rigor as other established sciences.

Due to the book's prominence, Varenius was known as "the geographer" within a decade of its publication. Varenius never lived to see this recognition as he died shortly after publishing the first edition at the age of 28.

== Content ==
Geographia Generalis was among the first comprehensive attempts to systematize geographical knowledge. Varenius aimed to compile all known geographical information and theories into a single coherent framework. His work synthesized the geographical knowledge of his time, drawing from various sources, including classical texts, travel accounts, and contemporary scientific observations. The book is intended as an introductory textbook, and therefore the mathematical content is considered to be intermediate.

Varenius divided the book into two main subsections: general geography and special geography. These two terms were likely borrowed from the work of Bartholomew Kecker. The main focus is general geography, which was further subdivided into three parts: the absolute part, the relative part, and the comparative part. Special geography was further subdivided into three parts: terrestrial, celestial, and human. The subsections within special geography are outlined but not expanded on in the work. It is speculated that Verenius intended a complimentary book on special geography, but died before being able to complete it. Special geography is today considered to be regional geography.

=== General Geography ===
==== The absolute part ====
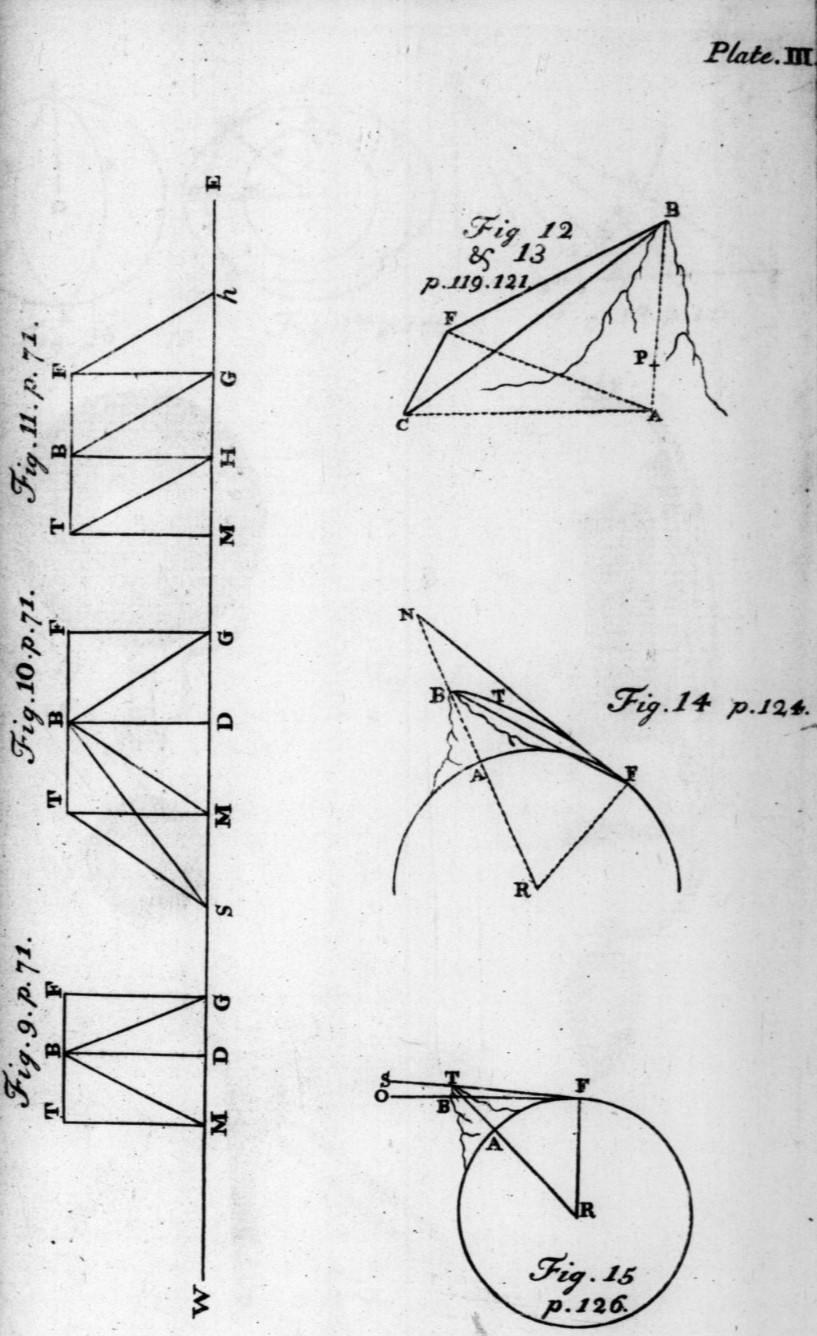
Geographia Generalis 1733 Figures 9, 10, 11, 12, 13, 14, and 15 showing measurement of mountains and topographic features

The absolute part contains information related to the Earth's shape and physical features. It is divided into six sections and contains 21 chapters. The first section contains two chapters discussing geometry and theory that are necessary to understand the rest of the book. The second section contains five chapters discussing the shape of the Earth, its size, its motion, and its composition. The third section contains four chapters and discusses physical geographic features, such as mountains, forests, and deserts. The fourth section contains six chapters and discusses water features, such as oceans, rivers, and lakes, as well as their motions. The fifth section contains one chapter titled "Concerning the change of dry places into rainy ones." This section details the transitions between climate zones, discusses changes in landforms and land cover types over time, and speculates on the underlying mechanisms. The sixth section contains three chapters discussing the atmosphere and winds.

==== The relative part ====
The relative part contains nine chapters on the zones of the Earth caused by its shape. Light, heat, climate zones, seasons, and the appearance of the Moon and Sun are discussed in these chapters.

==== The comparative part ====
The comparative part contains ten chapters related to comparing places to each other and navigation. There are two chapters related to ship construction and cargo. These chapters serve to contextualize the nautical navigation information. These sections demonstrate how the theoretical aspects of geography can be practically applied.

=== Special geography ===
The Special geography section contained a series of three outlines that may have been intended for elaboration in a later work. These included terrestrial, celestial, and human. Terrestrial geography includes a region's boundaries, latitude and longitude, mountains, mines, water features, animals, and the fertility of the land. The Celestial geography section covers a place's relationship to the equator and poles, the length of the day, the climate, and the observed motion of stars above the horizon. The outline of human geography contains the stature of a region's inhabitants, their food, customs, religions, languages, cities, historic events, and notable people.

=== Appendix ===
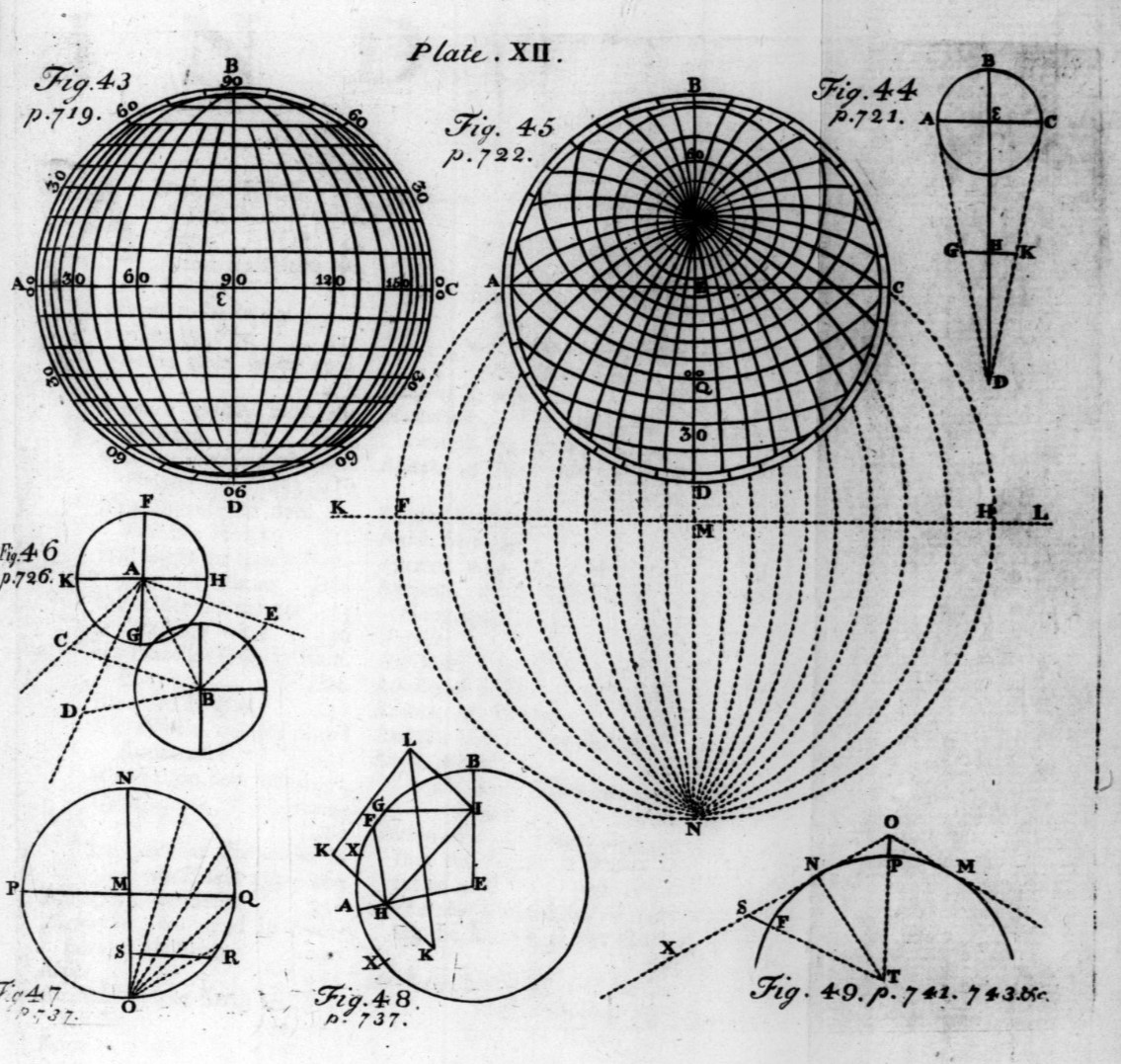
Some of the figures added by Isaac Newton in his 1672 and 1681 editions of the Geographia Generalis. These figures appeared in subsequent editions as well.

Several additions were made to later editions of the Geographia Generalis by editors and translators. In the final translation of the text by James Jurin an Appendix containing many of these additions was included. This appendix contains citations to works published since the first edition of the book, figures, and tables. Several of these figures and tables were added by Isaac Newton.

== Editions ==
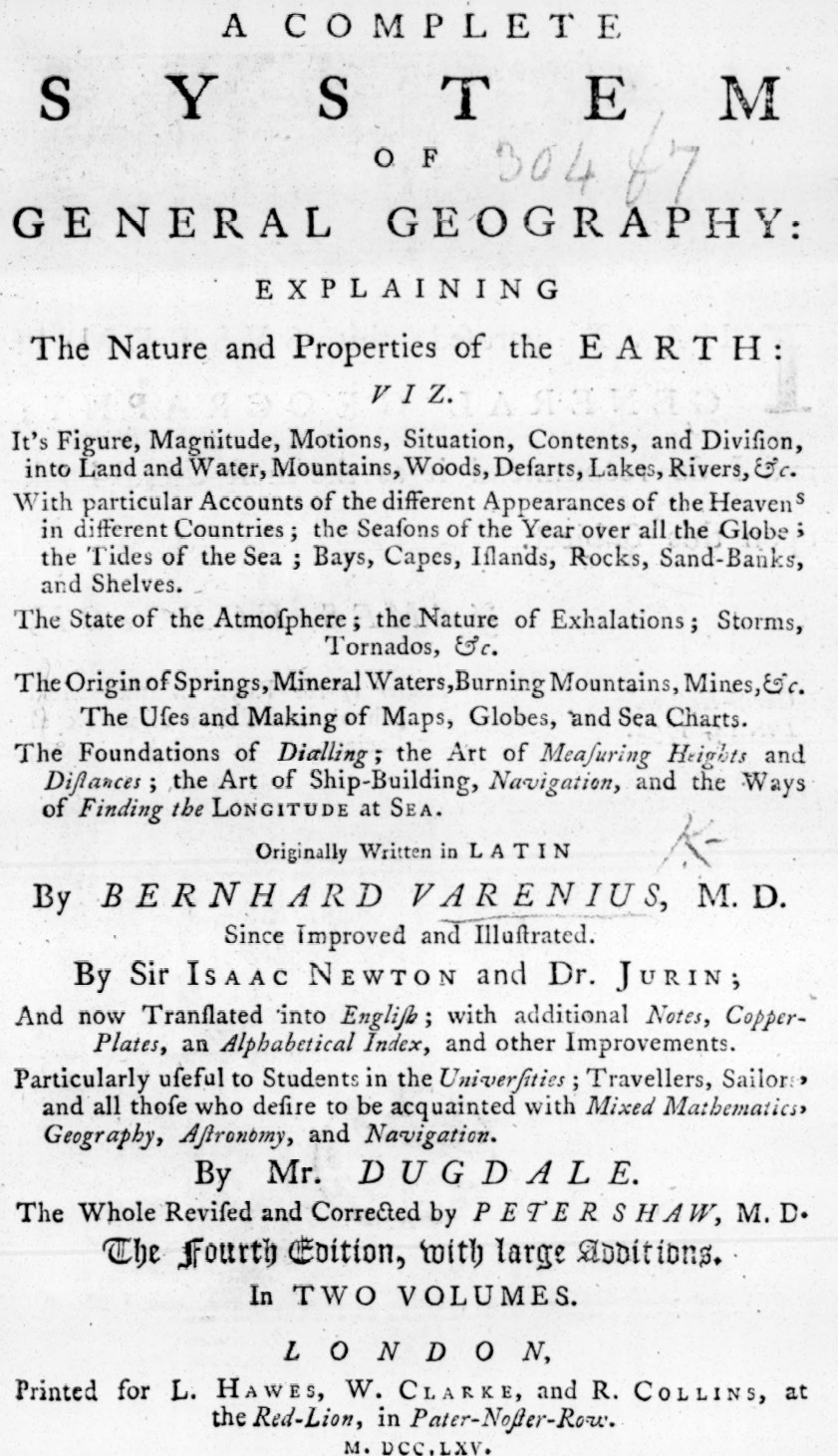
Title page of Dugdale-Shaw English translations of Geographia Generalis.

Geographia Generalis had several editions and translations, with several authors contributing to the text over time. It is therefore necessary to check earlier versions against translations to determine what it originally contained, and the true authorship of the final product is ambiguous. The first edition of Geographia Generalis was published in 1650 at the Elzevir press in Amsterdam. The first edition was 786 pages in length, and written in Latin. The book was very popular but had several errors and is described as being rushed and incomplete. To keep up with demand, in 1664, the text was reprinted at the Elzevir Press with formatting changes. In 1671 and 1672, Elzevir press released publications based on the 1664 one.

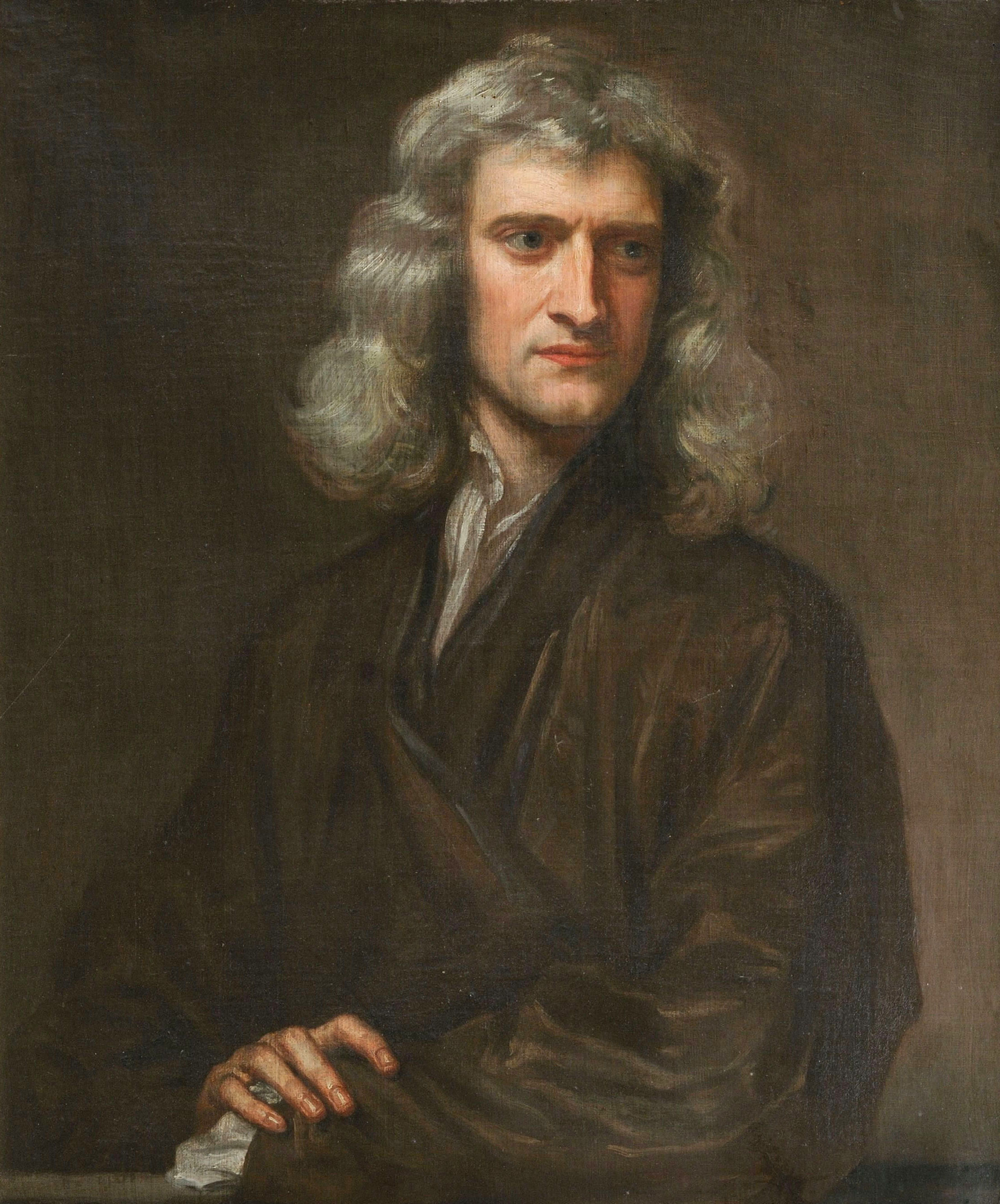
Portrait of Newton at 46, 1689

In 1672, Isaac Newton released an updated edition of the text, which included grammatical and typographical corrections, additional observations, corrections to calculations, and text restriction. These changes were substantial and on nearly every page of the text. Newton provided several figures and tables as well. Newton's additions mostly centered on mathematical content as it related to geographies, such as content related to projections, navigation, and cartography. In 1681, Newton released another updated edition of the text, including content related to shadows in the tropics. Newton also added the coordinates of Cambridge in the 1681 edition. The 1672 and 1681 editions were both published at Cambridge University Press.

In 1682, Richard Blome published an English translation of the text titled Cosmography and geography in two parts. This translation was based on the Elzevir press editions, and had text from French cartographer Nicolas Sanson's publication A Geographical Description of the World spliced into it. Blome's version of the text has been criticized for altering the meaning of sections, and for inconsistent tone. Many later translations and editions of the Geographia Generalis have been influenced by this version.

In 1712, the work was translated into Russian. This was influential to the development of Russian geography.

In 1721, James Jurin, with help from Edmond Halley and Roger Cotes, released a revised edition of the text based on Isaac Newton's Cambridge editions. The most significant addition to this edition by Jurian is an appendix with forty-six citations, and thirteen diagrams. These additions were motivated in part to advance Newtonianism as a response to the Cartesianism movement at Cambridge. The Jurin edition was still in the original Latin.

In 1733, the Jurin edition was translated into English by Peter Shaw and Dugdale. The Dugdale-Shaw English translations excluded some content, and added material that reinforced the Newtonian perspective. This edition was released three more times in 1734, 1736, and 1765.

== Legacy and impact ==
Geographia Generalis had a profound impact on the development of geography as a scientific discipline. It was widely read and used as a textbook for many years after its publication. English translations of the work were used in universities in both the United States and England and were widely read until the 1800s. The Russian translation was influential in the formation of the Russian tradition of geography, accelerating a trend of modernization in the discipline.

Multiple versions have led to confusion, and criticism of the later versions has been attributed to the original. This was particularly noteworthy in Alexander von Humboldt's discussion of the work, which referred to translations different from either the original or Newton's work. However, Newton's involvement in subsequent editions has made it continue to be relevant in discussing the history of geography.

The work was notable for its methodological rigor and systematic approach, setting a standard for future geographical studies. Through the mathematical quantification of space, the identification of universal spatial elements has been linked to spatial analysis. The UNESCO Encyclopedia of Life Sciences credit the Geographia Generalis with setting the basis for specialization in geography, setting the groundwork for scientific geography, and for being one of the first publications to distinguish between human and physical geography.

== See also ==
- Concepts and Techniques in Modern Geography – Series of geography texts, 1975–1996
- Four traditions of geography – Proposed way to organize themes within geography
- Geographic Information Science and Technology Body of Knowledge
- Geographica – Encyclopedia of geographical knowledge by Strabo
- Scientific Geography Series – Series of geography publications, 1985–1988
- Quantitative geography – Subfield of geographic methods
- Theoretical Geography – 1962 book by William Bunge
- Waldo Tobler bibliography – Geographer Waldo Tobler's publications
