= Duane Marble =

American geographer (1931–2022)

- Born: Duane Francis Marble; December 10, 1931; Seattle, Washington, U.S.
- Died: February 22, 2022 (aged 90); Redmond, Oregon, U.S.
- Occupation: Geographer
- Spouse: Jacquelynne Hardester (m. 1957)
- Children: 2

Academic background
- Education: University of Washington (BS, MA, PhD)
- Doctoral advisor: William Garrison

Academic work
- Discipline: Technical geography
- Sub-discipline: Quantitative geography; Geographic information science
- Institutions: University of Oregon; University of Pennsylvania; Northwestern University; University at Buffalo; Ohio State University; Oregon State University

Duane Francis Marble (December 10, 1931 – February 22, 2022) was an American geographer known for his significant contributions to quantitative geography and geographic information science (GIScience). Marble had a 40-year career as a professor at multiple institutions, retiring from the Ohio State University and holding a courtesy appointment as Professor of Geosciences at Oregon State University afterward. His early work was highly influential in computer cartography and is regarded as a significant contributor to the quantitative revolution in geography. His work on constructing a "Model Curricula" in GIScience is listed as the starting foundation built upon by the Geographic Information Science and Technology Body of Knowledge.

== Education and field ==
Marble earned three degrees in geography from the University of Washington: his B.S., his M.A. in 1956, and his Ph.D. in 1959. Here, he worked as a Ph.D. student under the influential quantitative geographer William Garrison. Marble was a member of a group of Garrison's students dubbed the "Space cadets," which included geographers such as Brian Berry, William Bunge, Michael Dacey, Arthur Getis, and Waldo Tobler. Like many of the members of this cohort, Marble went on to a prominent career in spatial analysis, GIScience, and quantitative geography.

== Career ==
Marbles 40 year long academic career included positions at multiple universities, including Northwestern University, the University of Pennsylvania, University at Buffalo, Ohio State University, University of Oregon. During his early career, he made great contributions to establishing the discipline of GIScience, computer cartography. His co-edited publication Spatial Analysis: a Reader in Statistical Geography is regarded as one of the founding documents in the quantitative revolution in geography. Among other things, this publication is one of the earliest uses of the term "spatial autocorrelation," a central concept in spatial analysis and technical geography. Because of this publication and others, he is considered a significant figure in quantitative geography, with the American Association of Geographers Marble Fund Award for Innovative Master’s Research in Quantitative Geography named in his honor.

Later in his career, he was instrumental in establishing Geographic information science as a discipline and worked to develop educational material and curriculum. While at the University at Buffalo, Marbles established the first GIScience research unit. His work on the "Model Curricula" is credited in the GIS&T body of knowledge as the starting point for that body of work. After retirement, Marbles worked to promote computer science and quantitative knowledge in geography to combat his concerns that geographers were losing understanding of what happened behind the GUI of their Geographic information systems. This led to him to help establish the AAG Marble Fund to promote quantitative geography and computer science research.

== Publications ==
Marble published several peer-reviewed journals and book chapters during their career.

They have authored, or served as a volume editor, for numerous books including:

Title	co-author(s) or volume editor(s)	Year first published	ISBN or LCCN	ref
Introductory Readings in Geographic Information Systems	Donna Jean Peuquet	2009	ISBN 978-0850668575	
Basic Readings in Geographic Information Systems	H. W. Calkins; Donna Jean Peuquet	1984	ISBN 0913913006	
Computer Handling of Geographic Data: An Examination of Selected Geographic Information Systems (Natural Resources Research, 13)	Roger Tomlinson; Hugh W. Calkins	1976	ISBN 92-3-101340-8	
Spatial Analysis: a Reader in Statistical Geography	Brian Berry	1968	LCCN 6801085 6-801085	

=== GIS Master Bibliography ===
In 1991, Marble began work compiling a master bibliography for GIS related scholarly material. In 1999, this bibliography was merged with the Esri GIS Bibliography, with Esri serving as the curator.

== Awards and recognition ==
In 2010, Michael DeMers of New Mexico State University established the "Duane Marble Award for GIS Design and Education Research" to recognize the work of Marble in GIScience, GIS design, and GIS curriculum development. The award is available to NMSU geography Masters student whose thesis involves either novel GIS methods or GIS education. In 2011, Marble was awarded a fellowship with the University Consortium for Geographic Information Science. Marble won the American Association of Geographers Honors Award in 1993, and the University Consortium for Geographic Information Science Education Award in 2007.

== AAG Marble Fund for Geographic Science ==
Marble established the Marble Fund for Geographic Science in 2005 with the help of Esri CEO Jack Dangermond. This fund exists to promote exposure to computer science concepts in geography undergraduate and graduate students through awards for GIScience research, each named for prominent quantitative geographers, including Marble's PhD advisor William Garrison. These awards include the Marble-Boyle Undergraduate Achievement Award, the Marble Fund Award for Innovative Master's Research in Quantitative Geography, and the William L. Garrison Award for Best Dissertation in Computational Geography.

== Personal life ==
Marble was married to Jacquelynne Hardester on August 18, 1957. Garrison attended the couple's wedding as one of the Best men. They couple has two children and two grandchildren. Marble passed away on February 22, 2022 in Redmond, Oregon.

== See also ==
- George F. Jenks – American geographer and cartographer
- Michael Frank Goodchild – British-American geographer
- Technical geography – Study of spatial information
