= Jack Dangermond =

American billionaire businessman

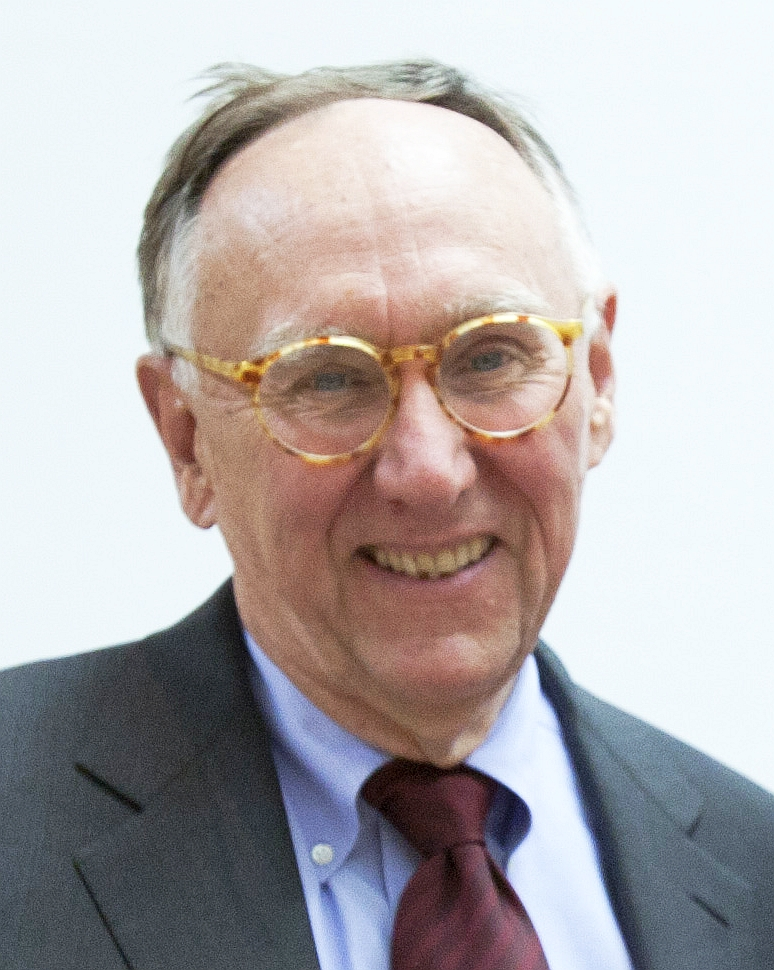
- Dangermond in 2012
- Born: Paul Jacob Dangermond; July 23, 1945 (age 81); Loma Linda, California, U.S.
- Education: California State Polytechnic University, Pomona (BS); University of Minnesota (MUP); Harvard University (MLA)
- Known for: Co-founder and president, Esri
- Spouse: Laura C. Herman (m. 1966)
- Website: esri.com

Paul Jacob Dangermond (born July 23, 1945) bka Jack Dangermond is an American billionaire businessman and environmental scientist. He is the co-founder and president of the Environmental Systems Research Institute (Esri), a privately held geographic information systems (GIS) software company that he started with his wife Laura in 1969. As of April 2026, his net worth was estimated at US$13.4 billion.

Dangermond, Esri's president, works at its headquarters in Redlands, California. He founded the company to perform land-use analysis; however, its focus evolved into GIS-software development, highlighted by the release of ARC/INFO in the early 1980s. The development and marketing of ARC/INFO positioned Esri with the dominant market share among GIS-software developers. Esri's flagship product, ArcGIS, traces its heritage to Dangermond's initial efforts in developing ARC/INFO.

Dangermond is the founder of GIS Day: an annual, worldwide event taking place since 1999 to celebrate accomplishments and to promote the use of GIS and its technology.

== Early life and education ==
Dangermond was born and raised in Redlands to Dutch immigrants: Peter Dangermond Sr. and Alice Meines. His parents owned a plant nursery in the town. Dangermond attended Redlands High School, and graduated in 1963.

Dangermond completed his undergraduate degree in landscape architecture at California State Polytechnic University, Pomona. He then earned a Master in Urban Planning from the University of Minnesota and a Master of Landscape Architecture degree from the Harvard University Graduate School of Design in 1969. His early work in the school's Laboratory for Computer Graphics and Spatial Analysis (LCGSA) led directly to the development of Esri's ARC/INFO GIS software. He has been awarded 13 honorary doctoral degrees.

== Career ==
In May 1970, Dangermond collaborated with Kingsbury Elementary School, located in Redlands, on a landscape design involving planting a total of 300 trees for its school grounds.

In 2000, Dangermond was selected to be a fellow for University of California, Riverside's A. Gary Anderson Graduate School of Management.

== Philanthropy ==
In 2005, Dangermond helped Duane Marble establish the American Association of Geographers Marble Fund for Geographic Science. The fund aims to advance GIScience education by providing awards to undergraduate and graduate student research. Awards include the "Marble-Boyle Undergraduate Achievement Award," "William L. Garrison Award for Best Dissertation in Computational Geography," and the "Marble Fund Award for Innovative Master's Research in Quantitative Geography."

In December 2017, Jack and Laura Dangermond donated $165 million to establish the Jack and Laura Dangermond Preserve on the Pacific coast, the largest ever gift to The Nature Conservancy.

Jack and Laura Dangermond have signed The Giving Pledge.

In January 2020, they donated $3 million to the Museum of Redlands fund.

== Honors ==
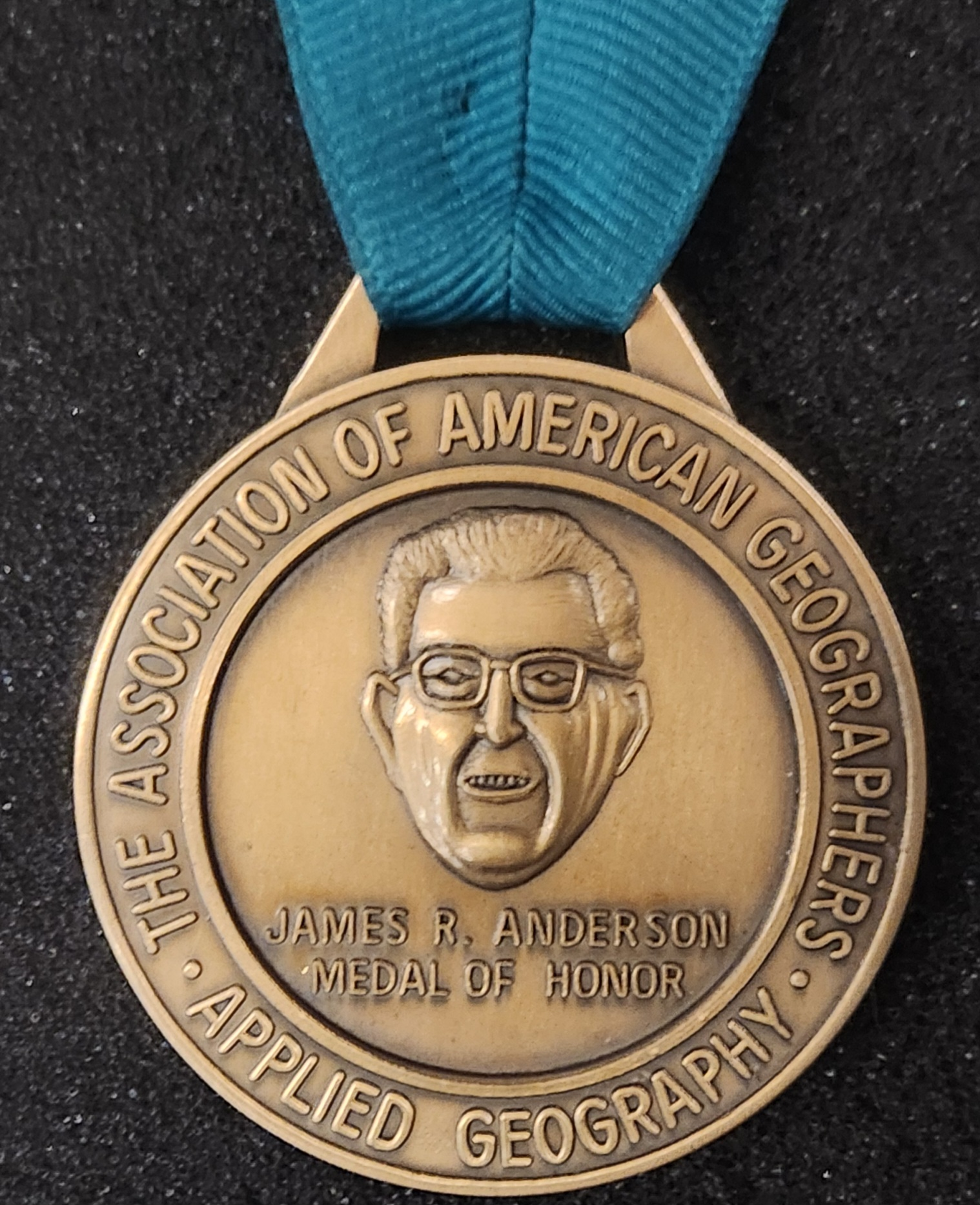
Anderson Medal of Honor in Applied Geography

Dangermond has received many awards, including:

- Officier in de Orde van Oranje Nassau
- Horwood Distinguished Service Award of the Urban and Regional Information Systems Association in 1988
- John Wesley Powell Award of the U.S. Geological Survey in 1996
- Anderson Medal of the Association of American Geographers in 1998
- Cullum Geographical Medal of the American Geographical Society in 1999
- EduCause Medal of EduCause
- Honorary doctorate from the University of West-Hungary in 2003
- Carl Mannerfelt Gold Medal of the International Cartographic Association in 2007
- Honorary doctorate from the University of Minnesota in 2008
- Patron's Medal of the Royal Geographical Society in 2010.
- Alexander Graham Bell Medal of the National Geographic Society in 2010, together with Roger Tomlinson.
- Fellow of the University Consortium for Geographic Information Science in 2012
- Recipient of the Entrepreneurial Vision Award (Champions of the Earth) in 2013.
- Audubon Medal of the National Audubon Society in 2015

== See also ==
- Geographic information science – Scientific discipline
- Michael Frank Goodchild – British-American geographer
- National Center for Geographic Information and Analysis
- Technical geography – Study of spatial information
  - Qualitative geography – Subfield of geographic methods
  - Quantitative geography – Subfield of geographic methods
- University Consortium for Geographic Information Science
