= Michael Dacey =

American geographer and spatial statistician

Michael Francis Dacey
- Born: 23 March 1932; Holyoke, Massachusetts, US
- Died: 23 December 2006 (aged 74); Evanston, Illinois, US
- Citizenship: United States of America
- Education: University of Kansas; University of Washington
- Scientific career
- Workplaces: Northwestern University
- Thesis: The Minimum Requirements Approach to the Urban Economic Base (1961)

Michael Francis Dacey (March 23, 1932 – December 23, 2006) was an American geographer known for his significant contributions to mathematical models in quantitative geography. Dacey founded the department of Mathematical Methods in the Social Sciences at Northwestern University, where he served as a senior associate dean in the College of Arts and Science, as well as a professor of geography, anthropology, and geological sciences. His publications were instrumental in establishing quantitative geography in mainstream geography.

== Education and field ==
Dacey earned three degrees in geography: his B.S. from the University of Kansas in 1954, his M.A. in 1955, and his Ph.D. in 1960, both from the University of Washington. He worked as a Ph.D. student under geography professor Edward Ullman, who served as an advisor. He was highly influenced by University of Washington geography professor William Garrison at this time.

During his time at the University of Washington, Dacey was instrumental in developing the concept of Spatial autocorrelation. Like many of his fellow graduate students at the University of Washington when Dacey was a student there, including Waldo Tobler, Duane Marble, and Arthur Getis, Dacey pursued a prominent career in the fields of spatial analysis, GIScience, and quantitative geography.

== Career ==
=== Military ===
U.S. Army Corps of Engineers (USACE) logo

After earning his master's degree from the University of Washington, Dacey served for two years in the Army Map Service, a cartographic agency that was under the United States Army Corps of Engineers. In the Army Map Service, he was stationed in Japan. He was discharged from the military in 1958.

=== Academic ===
After obtaining his Ph.D., Dacey's first academic position was as assistant professor of regional science at the University of Pennsylvania from 1960 to 1964. Here, he and fellow University of Washington student Duane Marble both worked under Walter Isard. In 1994 he moved to the Northwestern University department of geography, which he served as department chair of from 1976 to 1982. In 1978, Dacey established the Mathematical Methods in the Social Sciences (MMSS) at Northwestern to help students that had strong quantitative skills, but were uninterested in physical sciences. In 1987, Dacey became an associate dean in the Weinberg College at Northwestern, and later a senior associate dean in 1993.

=== Publications and research ===
Darcey published several books, technical documents, and peer-reviewed journals during his academic career that were influential to establishing quantitative geography within the mainstream of geography discipline. Dacey's early research on spatial statistics and Geographic information systems has been described as foundational to the discipline today. Darcey's work is cited by Arthur Getis as underpinning the origin of the concept of spatial autocorrelation, and is credited as the first geographer to cite P. A. P. Moran, and Roy C. Geary. His work in early spatial statistics involving spatial autocorrelation was limited by computer technology at the time, and therefore was unable to be confirmed until later.

In the 1964, geographer John Nystuen stated:

"It must be clear to the reader from the contents of this paper that Michael Dacey has indeed traveled over much ground. He has previously developed many of the results needed in this study. Many of his solutions and applications are ingenious. He exhibits an understanding of the theoretical implications of his work. He has a wide knowledge of the literature on probability and is able to adopt simulation methods and computer technology to his purpose. All he lacks is someone to talk to."

— John Nystuen, Foreword to Imperfections in the Uniform Plane,

His 1965 technical report for the Office of Naval Research Some Comments on Certain Technical Aspects of Geographic Information Systems, published with Duane Marble, is described by John Hessler, cartographic specialist at the Library of Congress, as "one of the most conceptually rich treatments of the foundations of Geographic Information Systems from these early years."

== Awards and recognition ==
During his career, Dacey received several honors and awards. These include:

- 1981 Northwestern University Distinguished Teaching Award
- 1979 Mathematical Geosciences Best Paper Award
- 1971 American Association of Geographers Meritous Contributions Award

In 2004, the Michael F. Dacey Award and Jeanette M. Dacey Award were created by the MMSS to honor Michael Dacey and his Wife Jeanette Dacey for their contributions to the program. These cash awards are given to students at the MMSS graduation party for most outstanding senior thesis and best performance in required coursework.

== Personal life ==
Michael and his wife Jeanette had one daughter. At the time of his death, he had one granddaughter.

== See also ==
- George F. Jenks – American geographer and cartographer
- Technical geography – Study of spatial information
- Torsten Hägerstrand – Swedish geographer (1916–2004)
