= Arthur Getis =

American geographer and spatial statistician

- Born: July 6, 1934; Philadelphia, Pennsylvania, US
- Died: May 13, 2022 (aged 87); San Diego, California, US
- Education: Pennsylvania State University; University of Washington
- Known for: Getis-Ord Statistics
- Scientific career
- Workplaces: Rutgers University; University of Illinois Urbana-Champaign; University of California, Santa Barbara; San Diego State University
- Thesis: A theoretical and empirical inquiry into the spatial structure of retail activities (1961)
- Doctoral advisor: William Garrison

Arthur Getis (July 6, 1934 – May 13, 2022) was an American geographer known for his significant contributions to spatial statistics and geographic information science (GIScience). With a career spanning over four decades, Getis authored more than one hundred peer-reviewed papers and book chapters, greatly influencing GIScience and geography as a whole. The Getis-Ord family of statistics, one of the most commonly used in spatial analysis, is based on his and J. Keith Ord's work and is still widely used in the creation of hot spot maps.

== Education and field ==
Arthur Getis earned both his B.S. and M.S. in Geography from Pennsylvania State University. In 1961, he earned his Ph.D. in geography at University of Washington Department of Geography. Here, he worked as a doctoral student under William Garrison, a prominent geographer and leader of the quantitative revolution in geography. His doctoral dissertation focused on individual behaviors and how they manifest as collective spatial patterns. This experience would set him on a path to researching spatial statistics as they apply to fields such as retail, public health, and crime clustering, among others.

== Career ==
Arthur Getis held many academic positions during his four decades-long career. After graduating from the University of Washington, Getis took a position at Michigan State University as an assistant professor where he worked from 1961 to 1963. While at Michigan State University, Getis served on the Social Science College Research Committee, and invented a Cartogram that was designed to focus the eye on a particular feature. Getis left MSU for a position at Rutgers University Livingston College in 1963, where he did groundbreaking research in the discipline of spatial analysis. In 1977, Gettis took a position in the geography department at the University of Illinois Urbana-Champaign, where he served as department head. In 1990, Getis left University of Illinois Urbana-Champaign to work at the University of California, Santa Barbara, where he headed a new joint Ph.D. program. In addition to these academic positions, he also held visiting professorships at the University of Bristol and the University of Cambridge.

During his career, Getis focused his research on spatial descriptive statistics, where he focused on topics like spatial autocorrelation, k-function analysis, and their applications to real-world problems. Working with Keith Ord, he created the innovative and highly influential Getis-Ord family of statistics.

Getis collaborated with numerous geographers throughout his career to advance GIScience, Geographic Information Systems (GIS), and geography as a whole. With Luc Anselin, Getis worked to explore the then-new technology of GIS. As the concept of computer cartography was only introduced in 1959 by Waldo Tobler, and the term "geographic information systems" introduced in the 1960s by Roger Tomlinson, this research was extremely influential in laying the foundation for GIS, and modern cartography. Getis worked with geographer Michael Goodchild to establish GIScience foundations in academia, advancing the discipline.

Getis worked with Manfred M. Fischer to found the Journal of Geographical Systems in 1994. This journal focuses on both theoretical and applied spatial modeling, methods, and results. Getis served as one of the editors-in-chief for this journal from 1994 to 2007, and as an honorary editor from 2008 until his death in 2022.

Getis served on the board of directors for the University Consortium for Geographic Information Science (UCGIS) from 1997 to 2001, when he was elected the organization's president, serving between 2001 and 2002. After serving as president of UCGIS, Getis was on the executive committee until 2004. In 1999, he served as the 40th President of the Western Regional Science Association.

== Publications ==
Getis published more than 100 peer-reviewed journals and book chapters during his career that have been cited over 25,000 times, giving him an h-index of 53. His 1963 publication Temporal Land Use Pattern Analysis With the Use of Nearest Neighbor and Quadrat Methods is noteworthy for appearing in the first Michigan Inter-University Community of Mathematical Geographers (MICMOG) series. His most influential, and highly cited paper, "Analysis of spatial association by use of distance statistics" lead to the creation of the Getis-Ord family of statistics. In addition to these, Getis helped author or edit eleven books, many still widely in use in geography classes. Several of these books were co-authored with his wife, Judy (Marckwardt) Getis, who held a master's degree in geography from Michigan State University and was a respected author.

These books include:

- Getis, Arthur; Bjelland, Mark; Getis, Victoria (2018). Introduction to Geography (15th ed.). McGraw Hill. ISBN 978-1-259-57000-1.
- Fischer, Manfred M.; Getis, Arthur (2010). Handbook of Applied Spatial Analysis: Software Tools, Methods and Applications. Springer Berlin, Heidelberg. ISBN 978-3-642-03646-0.
- Fellmann, Jerome; Bjelland, Mark; Getis, Arthur; Getis, Judith (2009). Human Geography (11 ed.). McGraw-Hill Education. ISBN 978-0073522852.
- Getis, Arthur; Lacambra, J.; Zoller, H., eds. (2004). Spatial Econometrics and Spatial Statistics. Palgrave Macmillan London. ISBN 978-1-4039-0797-4.
- Getis, Arthur; Getis, Judith; Quastler, Imre (2000). The United States and Canada: The Land and the People (2 ed.). McGraw-Hill. ISBN 978-0072356779.
- Boots, Barry; Getis, Arthur (1988). Point Pattern Analysis (Scientific Geography Series) (1 ed.). SAGE Publications, Inc. ISBN 978-0803925885.
- Getis, Arthur; Boots, Barry (1978). Models of Spatial Processes: An Approach to the Study of Point, Line and Area Patterns (1 ed.). Cambridge University Press. ISBN 978-0521103541.

== Getis-Ord family of statistics ==
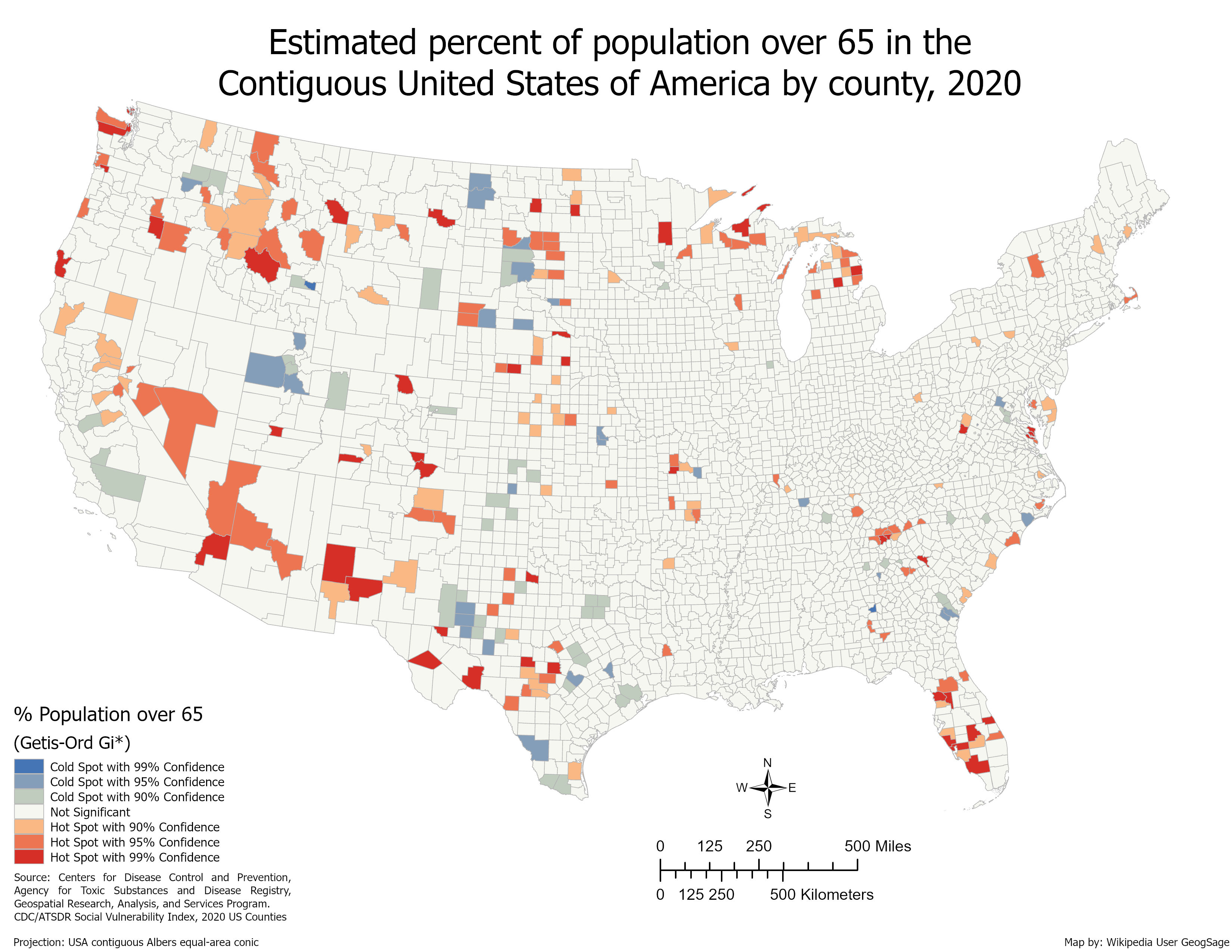
Hotspot map of the Estimated 2020 Population Over 65 in the contiguous United States of America.

The most influential work of Getis is his and Keith Ord's creation of the Getis-Ord family of statistics, which includes the Getis-Ord General G and Getis-Ord Gi* statistic. Based on a 1992 paper titled "The Analysis of Spatial Association by Use of Distance Statistics" and a 1995 paper titled "Local Spatial Autocorrelation: Distributional Issues and an Application", the Getis-Ord family of statistics are used extensively in spatial statistics. These are used to detect clustering of high or low values within a study area. The Getis-Ord family of statistics compliment Moran's I and Geary's C in looking at the spatial autocorrelation of phenomena in a study area.

The Getis-Ord family of statistics has been applied across a variety of disciplines, including epidemiology/public health, land use, crime analysis, and economics. They are used as the basis for "Hot spot analysis," "High/Low clustering analysis," and the creation of "Hot spot" maps by Esri software, such as ArcGIS.

== Awards and honors ==
During his career, Getis received many honors and awards. These awards include:

- Regional Science Association International Founder's Medal (2012)
- UCGIS Fellows grade (2010)
- American Association of Geographers Distinguished Scholarship Honors (2002)
- North American Regional Science Association Walter Isard Distinguished Scholarship award (1997)

=== Memorials ===
The Journal of Geographical Systems, and Journal Regional Geography both published memorials for Getis. In 2024, the Journal of Geographical Systems published a special issue titled "Arthur Getis: A LEGEND in Geographical Systems."

== Personal life ==
Getis was born and raised in Pennsylvania and was the youngest child of Samuel and Sophie (Zeitzew) Getis. He met Judith (Marckwardt) Getis while at the University of Washington, who he married in 1961 and had three daughters with. He enjoyed traveling, tennis, bridge, and scrabble.

== See also ==
- Alexander Stewart Fotheringham – British-American geographer
- Dot distribution map – Thematic map using dots to visualize distribution
- Duane Marble – American geographer (1931–2022)
- George F. Jenks – American geographer and cartographer
- Michael DeMers – American geographer and fiction writer
- Otsu's Method – In computer vision and image processing
- Quantitative geography – Subfield of geographic methods
- Technical geography – Study of spatial information
