= Waldo R. Tobler =

American geographer

Waldo Rudolph Tobler
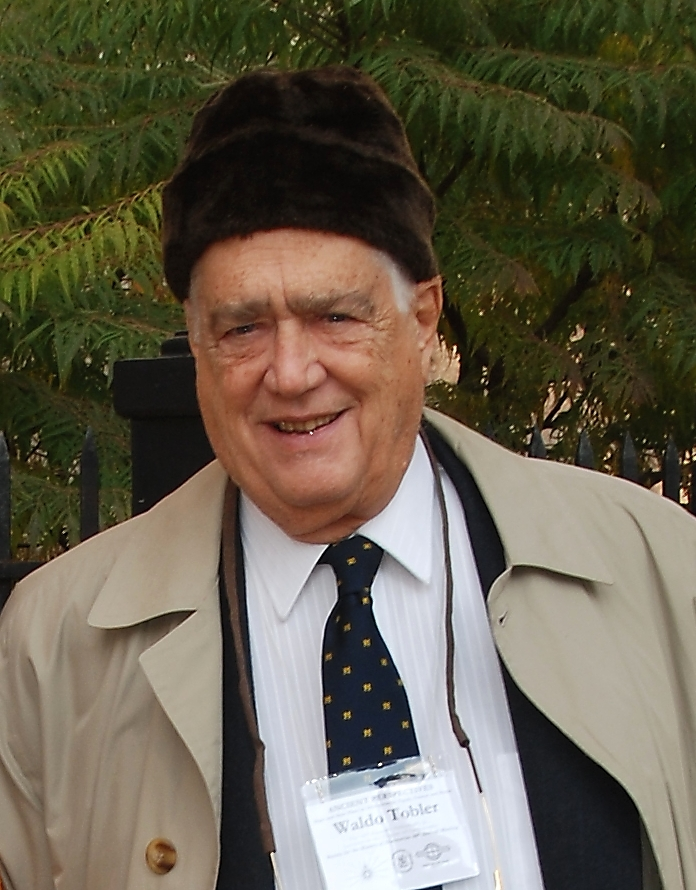
- Tobler in 2007
- Born: November 16, 1930; Portland, Oregon, U.S.
- Died: February 20, 2018 (aged 87); Santa Barbara, California, U.S.
- Education: University of British Columbia; University of Washington
- Scientific career
- Workplaces: University of Michigan; University of California, Santa Barbara
- Doctoral students: Sandra Arlinghaus

Waldo Rudolph Tobler (November 16, 1930 – February 20, 2018) was an American-Swiss geographer and cartographer. Tobler is regarded as one of the most influential geographers and cartographers of the late 20th century and early 21st century. He is best known for coining what has come to be referred to as Tobler's first law of geography. He also coined what has come to be referred to as Tobler's second law of geography.

Tobler's career had a major impact on the development of quantitative geography, and his research spanned and influenced the study of any discipline investigating geographic phenomena. He established the discipline of analytical cartography, contributed early to Geographic information systems (GIS), and helped lay the groundwork for geographic information science (GIScience) as a discipline. He had significant contributions to computer cartography and was one of the first geographers to explore using computers in geography. In cartography, he contributed to the literature on map projections, choropleth maps, flow maps, cartograms, and animated mapping. His work with analytical cartography included contributions to the mathematical modeling of geographic phenomena, such as human movement in the creation of Tobler's hiking function. Tobler's work has been described as ahead of its time, and many of his ideas are still unable to be fully implemented due to limitations of technology.

Tobler held the positions of professor of geography and professor of statistics at University of California, Santa Barbara and was an active professor emeritus at the Department of Geography until his death.

== Early life ==
Tobler was born in Portland, Oregon, in 1930 to parents Verner Tobler and Hanny Urech Tobler. His father was a Swiss consular employee, and this granted Waldo Tobler both Swiss and United States citizenship. His father's career resulted in moves to Seattle when Waldo Tobler was young, and later to Washington, D.C., when World War II started. During World War II, his father's duties included reporting on the treatment of German Prisoners of War held in the United States. Tobler attended junior high school in Chevy Chase, Maryland, while his father was stationed in Washington, D.C.

In May 1945, after the Allied victory in Europe, the family returned to Europe by boat from Boston, Massachusetts to Le Havre France, then by train to Paris, and finally to his parents' native Switzerland. His father was then stationed in Budapest, and Tobler attended boarding school for a year in Zurich, where he learned German, then public high school in St. Gall, and Bern. Geographers Pradyumna Prasad Karan and Cotton Mather speculated that this frequent moving in early life may have influenced Tobler's later career choices and passion for geography. Tobler later stated that these early travels may have contributed to a career in geography.

== Military service ==
When Tobler turned 18 in 1948, Switzerland wanted to draft him into the Swiss Army. To avoid the Swiss draft, Tobler traveled to France and joined the United States Army in 1948. A native speaker of English, Swiss German, and French, the military trained him to speak Russian to serve as an interpreter for the Counterintelligence Corps. During his time in the military, he served as both an intelligence analyst and an interpreter in Europe (mostly in Austria) during the Korean War, and participated in interviewing Austrian Prisoners of War who had been released from the Soviet Union. Tobler described this activity as "little more than industrial espionage." He left the military in 1952 and used his G.I. Bill to attend university.

== Education and field ==
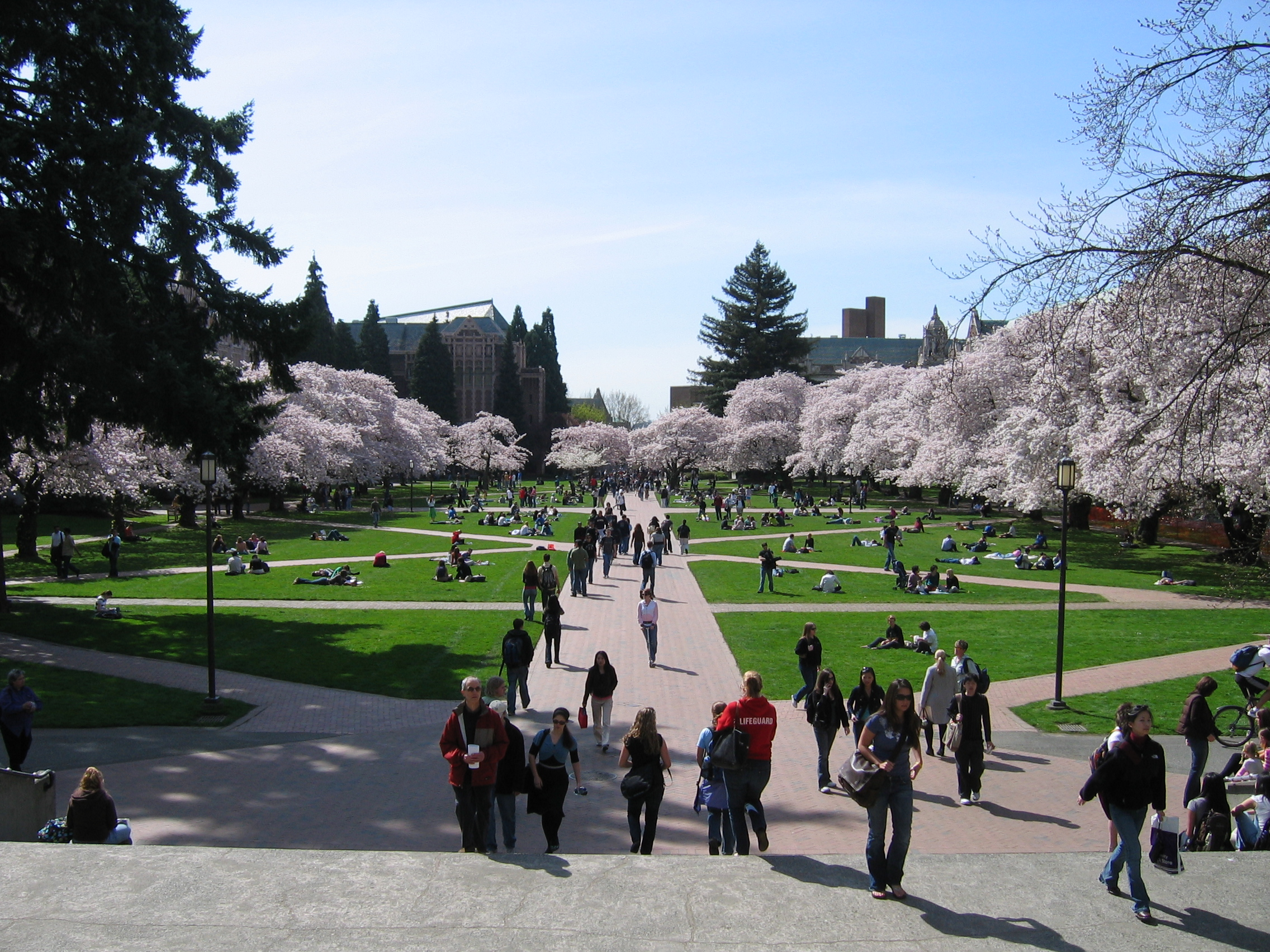
University of Washington "quad" in Spring 2007

After leaving the military, Tobler attended classes at University of British Columbia in Vancouver, Canada. Here, Tobler was introduced to Canadian Geographer John Ross Mackay, who Tobler convinced to allow him to take advanced cartography classes as a freshman. After two years at the University of British Columbia, Tobler transferred to the University of Washington in Seattle, from which he received his B.A. (1955), M.A. (1957), and PhD (1961), all in geography. Tobler returned for his PhD only after receiving a National Science Foundation fellowship to fund his studies.

At the Department of Geography, University of Washington, Tobler participated in the quantitative revolution of the late 1950s, working with geography professors Edward Ullman and William Garrison. Here, he became one of many of Garrison's grad students (dubbed the "space cadets") who would go on to be highly influential geographers. His master's thesis is titled "An Empirical Evaluation of Some Aspects of Hypsometric Colors", and his dissertation "Map Transformations of Geographic Space".

== Career and academic organizations ==
=== Student jobs ===
While the GI Bill funded much of Tobler's undergraduate courses, he took on several jobs during this time. As an undergraduate student, Tobler was offered positions on research expeditions to the Arctic. However, he turned down this position for a higher-paying job as a mucker in an underground gold mine in British Columbia. Tobler also worked parking cars part-time in Seattle and as a fire lookout in Seattle's Cedar River watershed. Tobler indicated that his choice to work in these positions rather than participate in research expeditions influenced his later specialization in geography. If he had taken the research position, he likely would have been a physical geographer.

After graduating with his B.S. in geography, Tobler was offered a position as a cartographic assistant at the University of Washington, which enabled him to pursue his master's degree.

=== System Development Corporation ===
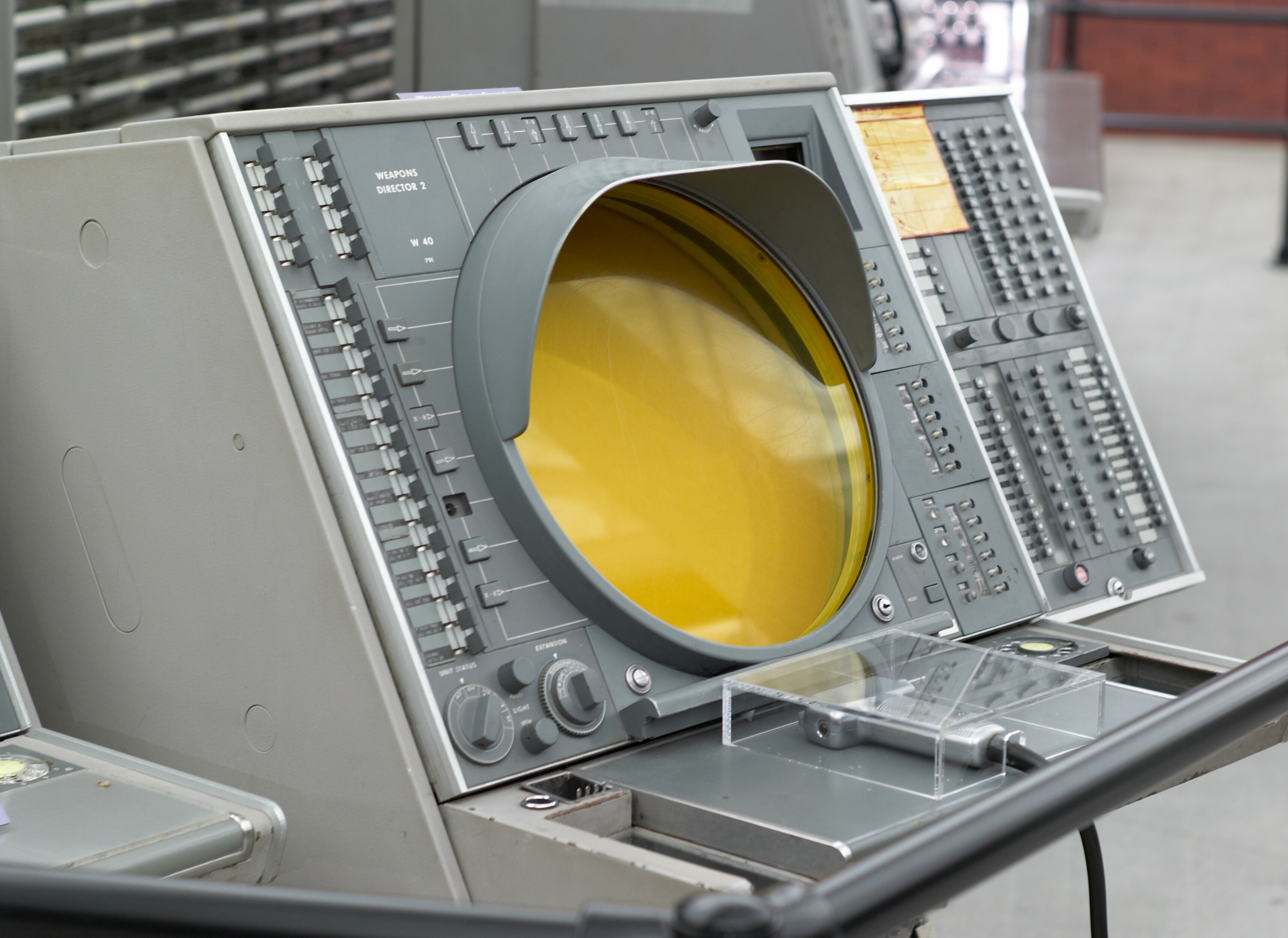
A SAGE (Semi-Automatic Ground Environment) terminal used during the Cold War to analyze radar data in real-time to target Soviet bombers.

In 1957, after obtaining his master's degree, Tobler began work for the System Development Corporation (SDC), a spinoff of the RAND Corporation, in Santa Monica, California. Here, Tobler worked on developing the Semi-Automatic Ground Environment (SAGE) system, a system that combined both RADAR and computers to detect Soviet bomber aircraft, coordinate interceptor aircraft, and ultimately prevent a Soviet nuclear first strike. Tobler's job entailed creating plastic overlay maps for Radar screens to train RADAR operators during exercises. These maps were created manually but printed using computers such as the IBM 704. With these, SDC experimented with duplication and generating maps using computers directly. Tobler's experience here influenced his later academic publications and research on computer and analytical cartography.

In 1958, the American Association of Geographer's annual meeting was held in Los Angeles, California. At this meeting, Tobler arranged a tour of the computer facilities that SDC operated. (Note: In Tobler's Autobiography, he indicates that the AAG annual meeting occurred in the Spring. However, the schedule published in The Professional Geographer has the 1958 conference in the week of August 17. The 1958 conference schedule does not mention a trip to SDC facilities but does mention a field trip to the "Los Angeles Urban-Industrial Area.") Tobler stated this was his first experience with the AAG.

=== Pierce County planning commission ===
After the SDC, Tobler worked for two years for the Pierce County planning commission. During this time, he worked to create land-use maps by manually shading with colored pencils. He left this position after getting an NSF fellowship and returned to school to get his PhD.

=== University of Michigan ===
After earning his PhD in 1961, Tobler became an assistant professor at the University of Michigan. While at the University of Michigan, Tobler was a member of the Michigan Inter-University Community of Mathematical Geographers (MICMOG), organized by fellow University of Washington geography PhD graduate William Bunge, which brought together faculty from both the University of Michigan and Michigan State University. These meetings sought to discuss topics related to quantitative geography, and organized joint seminars, which resulted in several discussion papers. At the MICMOG meetings, Tobler was given the nickname "Ptobler", as he was "the greatest cartographer since Ptolemy." The MICMOG seminars and publications eventually led to the creation of the journal Geographical Analysis. Tobler remained at the University of Michigan until 1977.

=== University of California, Santa Barbara ===
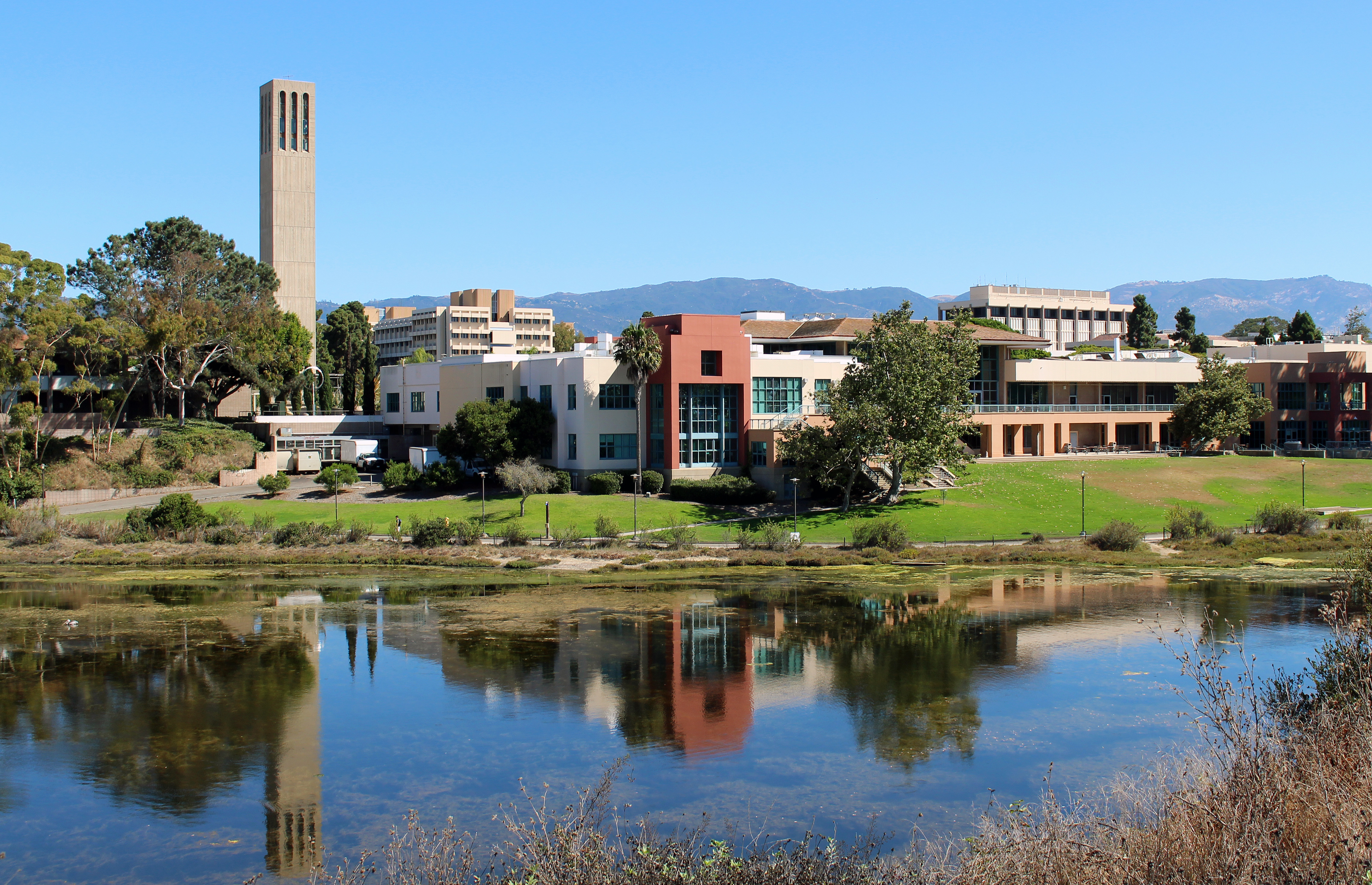
UCSB University Center and Storke Tower

In 1977, Tobler then moved to the University of California, Santa Barbara 1977, to be closer to the West Coast, where he grew up. Here, he continued his research in applying computers to cartography, flow, and other applications. At UC Santa Barbara, he worked with geographers Reginald Golledge and Michael Frank Goodchild. Until his retirement, he held the positions of Professor of Geography and Professor of Statistics at the University of California, Santa Barbara. He was an active Professor Emeritus here until his death.

=== Other organizations ===
National Science Foundation logo used from 1999 to 2009

Tobler was one of the principal investigators and a senior scientist in the National Science Foundation-sponsored National Center for Geographic Information and Analysis. Tobler served on the National Research Council the Board on Earth Sciences. He has been on the editorial board of several journals, including The American Cartographer, Journal of Regional Science, Geographical Analysis, and the International Journal of Geographical Information Systems. He was a charter member of the Urban and Regional Information Systems Association, a council member of the Regional Science Association, member and chairman of the Mathematical Social Science Board, and served as the United States delegate to the International Geographical Union Commission on Geographical Data Processing and Sensing. Until his retirement, he was a member of the Royal Geographical Society of Great Britain.

== Research and publications ==
While Tobler may have fewer publications than some contemporary geographers, his publications covered a broad range of topics and are considered of exceptional quality. His career in geography profoundly impacted the discipline, and he is perhaps the most influential geographer of the past century. The Library of Congress maintains some of Tobler's early work in "The Waldo Tobler Collection" within the broader "Geographic Information Systems (GIS) & Geospatial Resources," and the UC Santa Barbara Library maintains a collection of his work in "The Waldo Tobler Academic Archives".

=== Cartography ===
Waldo Tobler described himself as a "geographical cartographer", and his research interests reflect this. He published the first paper on using computers for making maps, established the discipline of analytical cartography, and contributed to the literature around thematic maps. His early work, including his dissertation, involved map projections, which he continued to work on throughout his life. Tobler's time working at SDC on the SAGE system influenced his development of both computer and analytical cartography, and it is possible much of his work was kept confidential for some time due to military applications. Geographer Mark Monmonier described Tobler as "arguably the twentieth century's most innovative cartographer."

==== Map projections ====
The Tobler hyperelliptical projection with Tissot's indicatrix of deformation; α = 0, k = 3

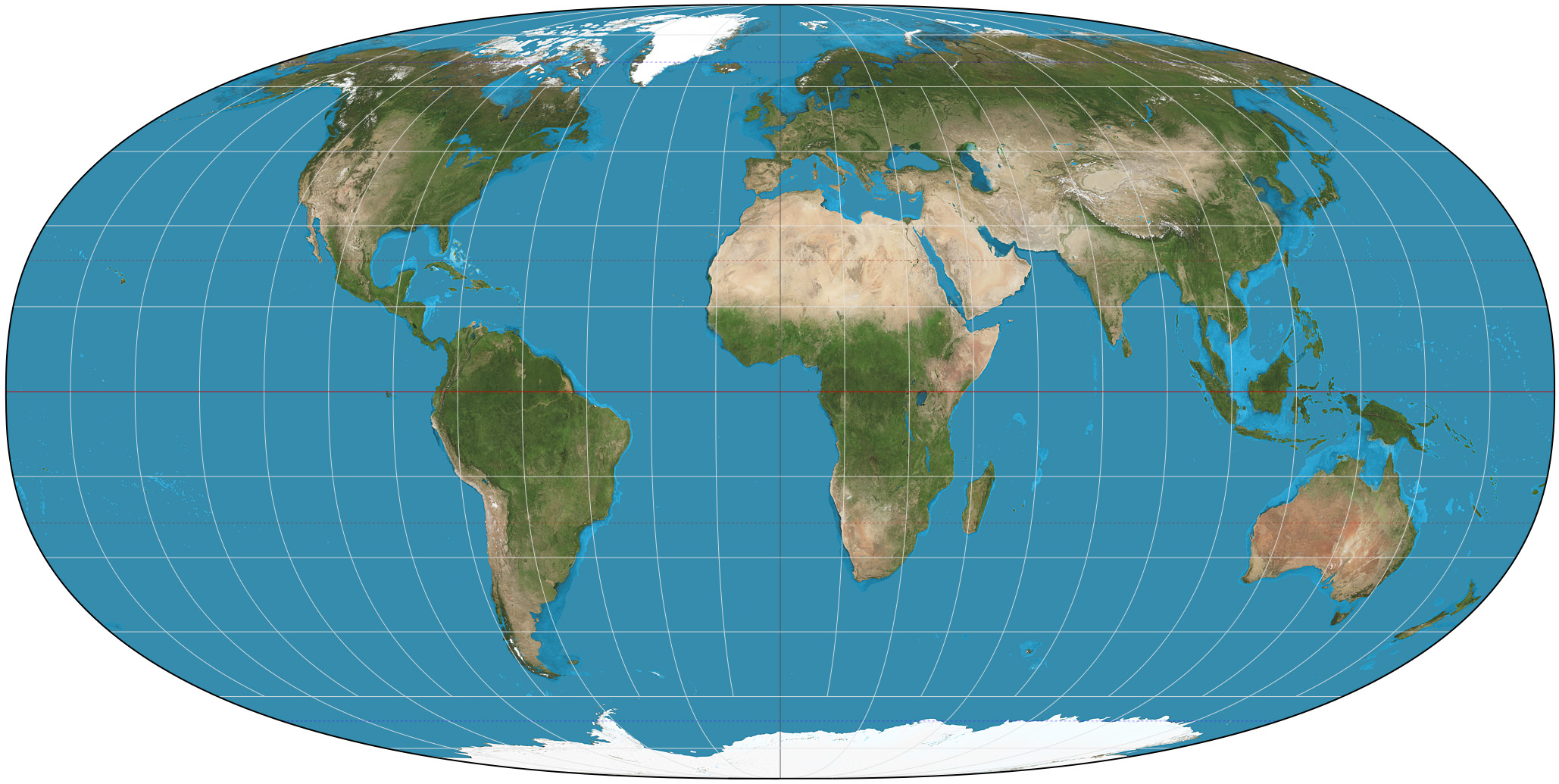
The world on Tobler hyperelliptical projection. 15° graticule; α = 0, γ=1.18314; k= 2.5.

One of Tobler's largest interests, especially early in his career, was map projections, with much of his dissertation focusing on them. He is the inventor of novel and unusual map projections, including the family of Tobler hyperelliptical projections and the first derivation of the partial differential equations for area cartograms. He also invented a method for smooth two-dimensional mass-preserving areal data redistribution.

In 1972, Tobler translated and published Johann Heinrich Lambert's 1772 "Notes and comments on the Composition of Terrestrial and Celestial Maps." Tobler served as the third author of a book by Qihe Yang and John P. Snyder titled "Map Projection Transformation: Principles and Applications." This book was based on substantial translations by first author Qihe Yang from his work originally published in Chinese, and Tobler stepped in to help revise and assemble the book after Snyder died.

==== Computer cartography ====
Using his time and experience on the SAGE system, Tobler built upon the concepts and published his work in academic journals. Computer cartography originates as a concept from a paper written by Waldo Tobler as a graduate student in 1959, titled "Automation and Cartography". This paper's concepts, such as the "Map in-Map out" system (MIMO), was extremely influential in early Geographic Information Systems. Tobler's research in developing applications for computer cartography is described by Mark Monmonier as occupying "a pivotal place in map history".

==== Analytical cartography ====
Tobler's research emphasized mathematical modeling and graphic interpretations in geography through cartography. In 1976, he published a paper titled "Analytical Cartography", which pioneered the discipline of analytical cartography. Analytical cartography is the foundation for many of the developments in Geographic information systems, and shapes how spatial analysis and cartography are taught today. Keith C. Clarke defined Analytical cartography as "the theoretical and mathematical background behind cartography and the rules cartographers employed in the mapping process." Analytical cartography is described as the leading paradigm in cartography and is likely Tobler's most enduring contribution to the discipline.

==== Animated mapping ====
Animated dot density map of COVID-19 cases in Connecticut between March 21, 2020 and May 21, 2020

Tobler was among the first to create a true animated map, using animation to show change over time, in his famous 1970 paper, "A Computer Movie Simulating Urban Growth in the Detroit Region." While this paper is most often cited as the first time the first law of geography was invoked, the focus of the paper was on animation to show change over time, with the first law an "aside" to this.

==== Choropleth ====
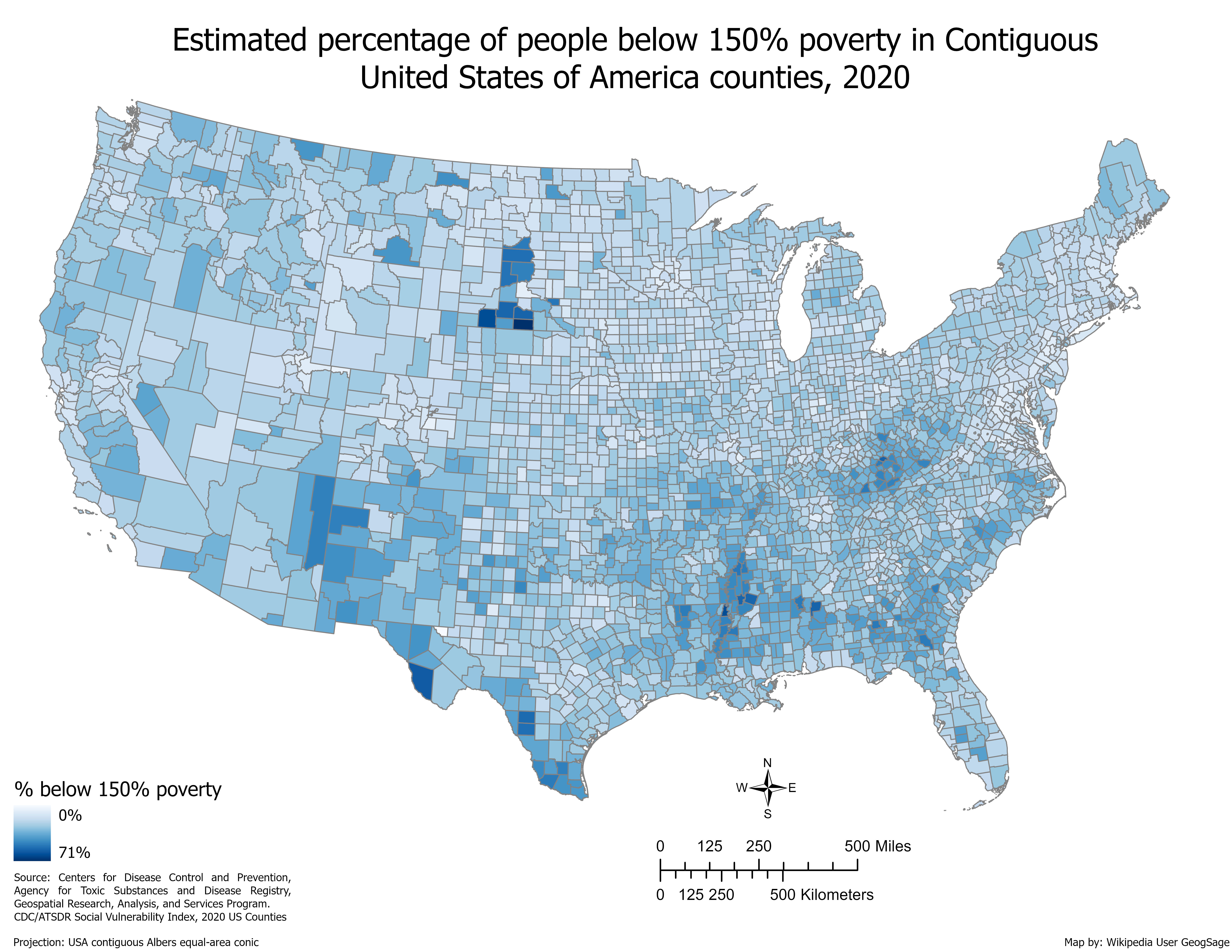
Estimated percentage of people below 150% poverty in Contiguous United States Counties, 2020 shown with a continuous, unclassified, colorscheme.

Tobler formally introduced the unclassified color scheme for choropleth maps in 1973. Tobler argued that these maps would increase data density, and avoided many of the issues with Data binning and Statistical classification. There has been significant debate around the best approach to solve this issue with choropleth maps, and most choropleth maps today continue to make use of class breaks. Other approaches to creating classes in choropleth maps include using the Jenks natural breaks optimization, quantile, or equal class intervals.

==== Cartograms ====
Tobler's interest in cartograms stemmed from his interest in map projections. A chapter of his dissertation was developed for their creation, later adapted and published in the Geographical Review. Tobler was among the first to use computers to create cartogram maps, with the rubber sheet method being the first method he proposed for their creation. This method uses rubbersheeting to transform the map coordinates based on the values of interest. He later proposed the "Pseudo-Cartogram" method, which approximates the pycnomirastic solution. Tobler's methods for creating cartograms are still employed, however they have some practical problems in implementation that can sometimes ruin topology. Tobler's methods serve as the basis for many other methods to create them.

==== Flow maps ====
Tobler was also concerned with representing flow (due to its involvement with movement as a mechanism of geographic change), and considered them critical to understanding geography. Combining this interest in movement with his knowledge of cartography, Tobler worked on incorporating flow maps to the problem. While crude, the result of this research was that Tobler was the first to develop a software approach to creating flow maps in 1987. The first demonstration of this technology by Tobler involved mapping the flow of money through the US Federal Reserve to the various US states. In 2003, Tobler released a freeware, Microsoft Windows-based version of his flow representation software Flow Mapper. Tobler's flow mapper software, and similar programs, continue to be built upon and applied to new topics.

==== Spatial interpolation and isorhythmic mapping ====
Spatial interpolation, which involves estimating values for a spatial surface from sample locations, is a major research focus and application in spatial analysis. Tobler published several studies on different approaches to spatial interpolation, including an extension of bilinear weighted interpolation and other models.

Tobler's pycnophylactic approach to interpolation had early applications to interpolation of surfaces used in isarithmic mapping on computers. Tobler's approach was more straightforward than other methods of the time, and is more appropriate for samples collected at enumeration units like census tracts.

==== Spatial Resolution ====
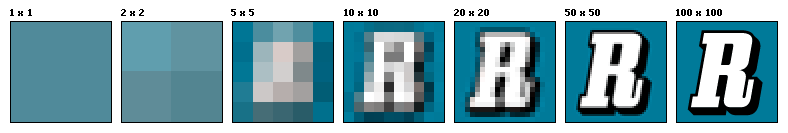
Illustration of how spatial resolution impacts ability to distinguish objects in an image.

According to Tobler, a dictionary definition of resolution is "the capability of making distinguishable the individual parts of an object". In terms of digital raster data, which consists of pixels, spatial resolution (also referred to as ground sample distance GSD) refers to the size of one pixel on the ground.

With regard to spatial resolution Tobler has formulated the following rule of thumb: "The usefulness of a GIS is constrained by its spatial resolution. The size of the smallest detectable feature is twice that of the resolution. The rule is: divide the denominator of the map scale by 1,000 to get the detectable size in meters. The resolution is one half of this amount."

The spatial precision of a database is expressed by a distance and a scale, which are mathematically related by this rule of thumb about the relation between map scale and image resolution. This rule is derived from the equivalent of 0.5 mm on a map, the smallest physical mark that a cartographer can make:

- Map Scale = Raster resolution (in meters) * 2 * 1,000

or

- Raster resolution (in meters) = Map Scale /(2 * 1,000)

By example, if the image resolution is 5m only the map scale should not be larger than 1:10,000. If you want to work at a scale of 1:2,000 the image resolution should be at least 1m.

=== Laws of Geography ===
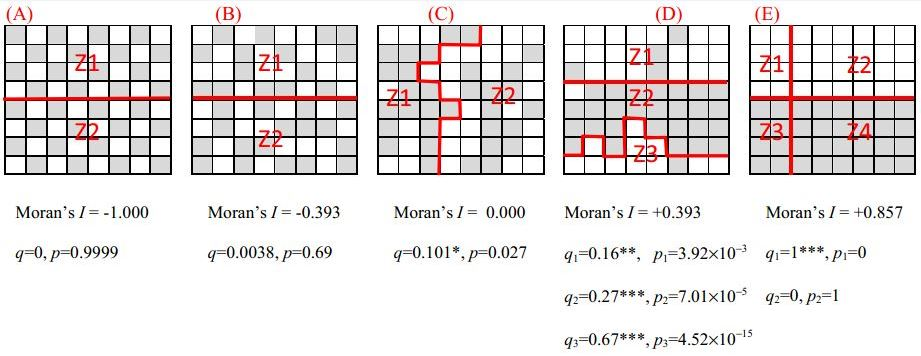
A hand map with different spatial patterns, and corresponding Moran's I values. Moran's I is often used to demonstrate the practical applications of Tobler's first law of geography.

In a 1970 paper in the journal Economic Geography where he discussed creating a computer movie of Detroit, Tobler stated, "I invoke the first law of geography: everything is related to everything else, but near things are more related than distant things". This text following the colon in his statement, which was not the main focus of the paper, is now known as "Tobler's First Law of Geography", and is probably what Tobler is most famous for. The first law of geography is widely cited and is relevant today, particularly within the sub-discipline of geographic information science. The Geographic Information Science and Technology Body of Knowledge "Model Curricula" in particular emphasizes the importance of the first law in the section on "Metrical relationships: distance and direction." It is considered the theoretical basis of many statistics in spatial analysis, including those involved in cluster analysis and spatial autocorrelation (such as Moran's I). Spatial autocorrelation, and Tobler's 1970 paper, are considered central to modern approaches in technical geography. Tobler's first law is included in the children's book "ABCs of Geography" under the letter "T" for "Tobler".

In a 1999 paper titled "Linear pycnophylactic reallocation comment on a paper by D. Martin," Tobler stated "Philosophically, the phenomenon external to an area of interest affects what goes on in the inside; a sufficiently common occurrence as to warrant being called the second law of geography." In his 2004 paper "On the First law of Geography: A reply", he discussed this concept again. This has come to be known as Tobler's second law of geography. In Tobler's 2004 paper, he discussed other potential candidates for laws of geography, including one proposed by Giuseppe Arbia, R. Benedetti, and G. Espa in a 1996 paper that stated "Everything is related to everything else, but things observed at a coarse spatial resolution are more related than things observed at a finer resolution." This has come to be known as Arbia's law of geography.

The laws of geography, particularly Tobler's first law of geography, have been debated heavily in literature, with their status as scientific laws questioned, changes and amendments proposed, exceptions noted, and corresponding defenses by proponents of the laws. Tobler weighed in on this debate surrounding his law, and others, in a 2004 article titled "On the First law of Geography: A reply".

=== The Global Demography Project ===
The Global Demography Project was conducted by the National Center for Geographic Information and Analysis to map the human population in a series of 5 by 5 minute, or roughly one-kilometer, grids for most of the Earth. While this project had serious limitations, largely due to data limitations, it was the finest scale population set produced to that point. The project was later supported by the Columbia University's Center for International Earth Science Information Network.

Tobler's hiking function – walking speed vs. slope angle chart.

=== Tobler's hiking function ===
Tobler was an avid hiker, and combined this with his interest in flow and movement to generate "Tobler's hiking function", also known as "Tobler's walking rule". In this research, Tobler used himself as a subject, and published the results in a 1993 paper. With this function, he sought to model and predict an average hiker's walking speed on various slopes. Researchers have suggested this function has various real-world applications, including for self-driving cars, route decisions, and wayfinding apps.

=== Archaeological modeling ===
While at UC Santa Barbara in 1971, Tobler published models to predict the location of archaeological sites. Using the frequency of locations being noted in Cuneiform tablets discussing commercial transactions, he estimated the distance between the towns in Babylonia using a reverse gravity model. Many of these predictions were for unknown locations and were proven accurate for at least three known towns; however, more excavation is needed to confirm the remainder of his predictions. These ideas serve as the basis for numerous similar computer simulations to model ancient human migration, such as the settlement of Polynesia.

== Awards and honors ==
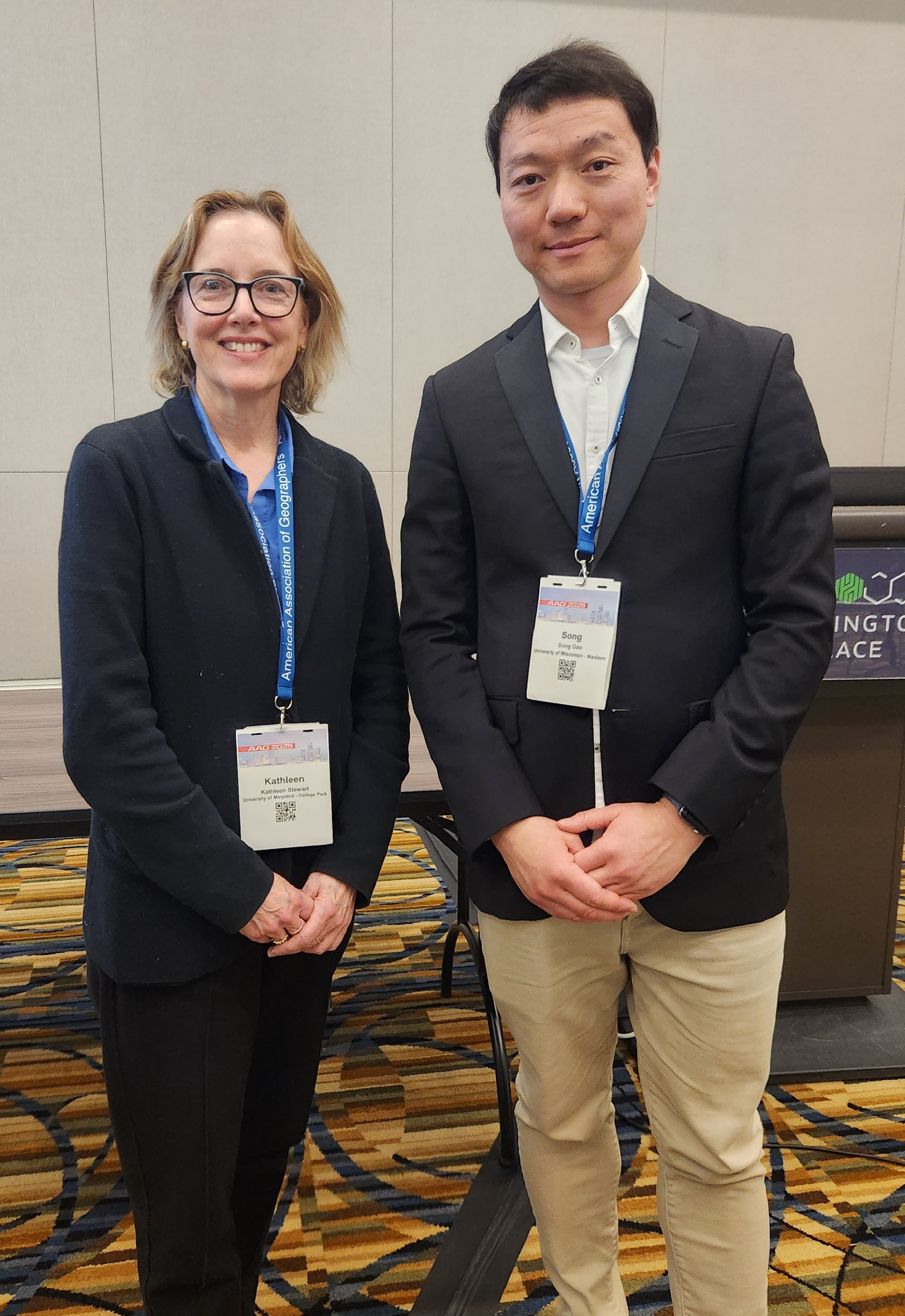
Speakers Dr. Song Gao and Dr. Kathleen Stewart at the 2025 GISS Waldo Tobler and TGIS Distinguished Lecture in GIScience. Detroit Michigan, March 25th, 2025.

The University of Zurich, Switzerland, awarded him an honorary doctorate in 1988.

The Austrian Academy of Sciences created the Waldo Tobler Awards, which include the Waldo Tobler GIScience Prize and the Young Researcher Award in Geographic Information Science, to recognize Tobler's contributions to geographic research. The awards seek to "encourage scientific advancement in the disciplines of Geoinformatics and/or Geographic Information Science." The Waldo Tobler GIScience Prize is issued to individuals who have "exhibited outstanding and sustained contributions to the discipline worthy of inspiring young scientists in Geoinformatics or Geographic Information Science, and has accomplished significant advances in these fields." It has since been issued to David Mark (2016), Thomas Poiker (2017), Helena Mitasova (2018), Michael Batty (2019), Luc Anselin (2022), and Sara Irina Fabrikant (2023). The Young Researcher Award in Geographic Information Science is awarded to "individuals, typically under the age of 35, acknowledging publications enhancing the body of Geoinformatics or GIScience literature." It has since been issued to Filip Biljecki (2015), Xingjian Liu (2016), Song Gao (2016), Chen Min (2017), Pablo Cabrera Barona (2017), Auriol Degbelo (2018), Wei Luo (2018), Franz-Benjamin Mocnik (2019), Yingjie Hu (2019), Laura Knoth (2020),Yuhao Kang (2023 ), and Weiming Huang (2022).

The American Association of Geographers Geographic Information Science and Systems Specialty Group (AAG GISS) and the publication Transactions in GIS hosts an annual session at the AAG conference titled "The Waldo Tobler Distinguished Lecture in GIScience." This session honors the legacy of Waldo Tobler by featuring a leading researcher in GIScience. The selected speakers are given the Tobler Lecture Award.

Mark Monmonier noted that Tobler "is one of a small handful of then-living persons accorded one of the 52 biographical entries in the twentieth-century volume of the History of Cartography."

Other awards and honors Tobler received throughout his life include:

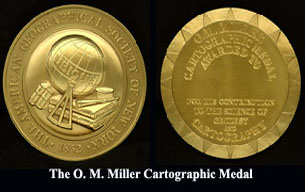

- Member of the National Academy of Sciences of the United States
- Honorary Fellow, American Geographical Society (1965)
- Osborn Maitland Miller Medal, American Geographical Society 1989
- Meritorious Contributor Medallion, Association of American Geographers, 1971
- Andrew McNally Award, 1986
- ESRI Lifetime Achievement Award, 1999.
- AAG Microcomputer Specialty Award, 1993.
- UCGIS Honorary Fellow, 2012
- Archaeological Institute of America Pomerance Award for Scientific Contributions to Archaeology, 2014
- GIS Hall of Fame Inductee, URISA (Urban and Regional Information Systems Association), 2016.

=== Memorials ===
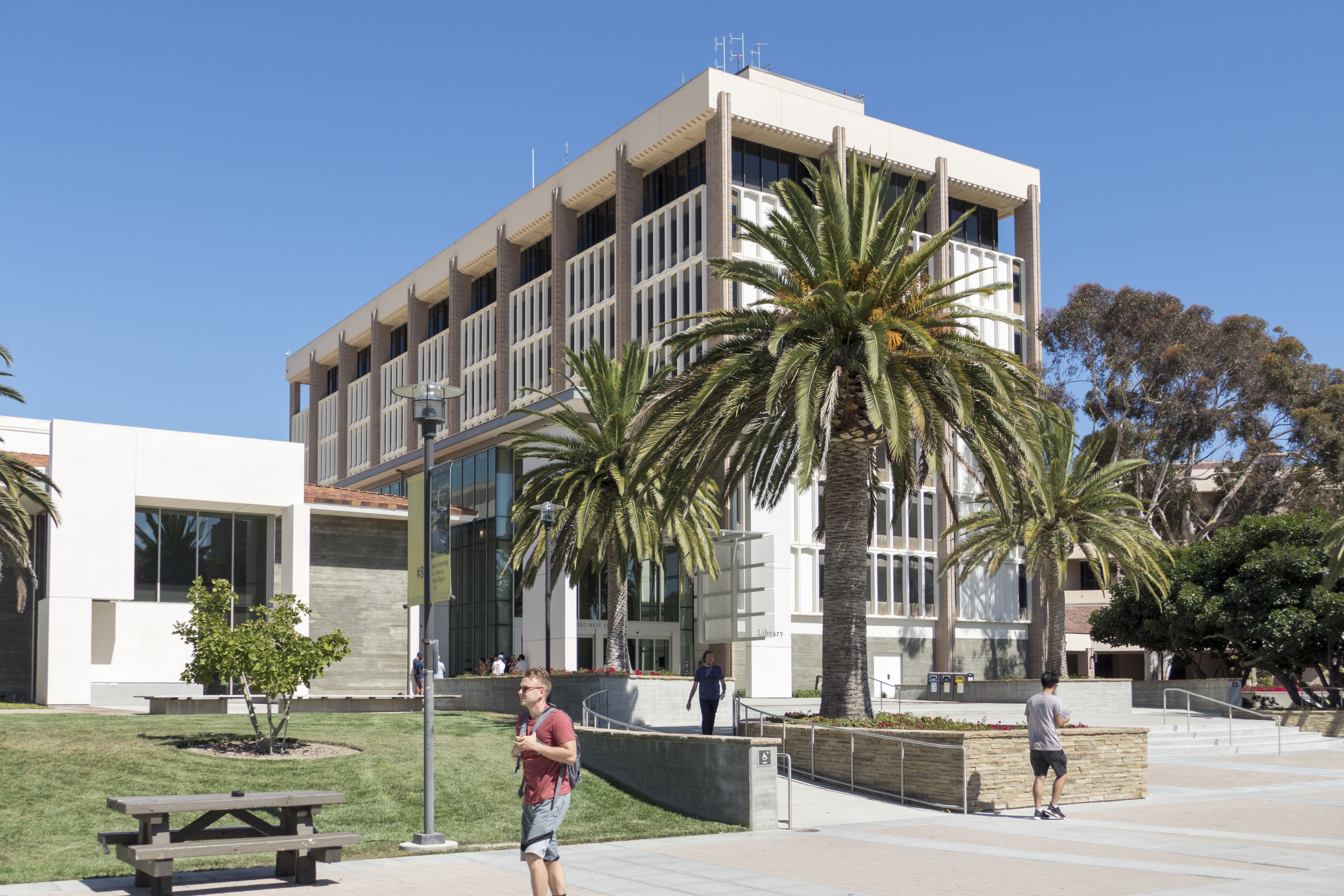
UC Santa Barbara Library where the Waldo Tobler Archives are hosted.

Rachel Tobler (Waldo Tobler's widow) and the Geography department at UC Santa Barbara established the "Waldo Tobler Memorial Lecture Fund" in honor of Waldo Tobler. The fund helps "to support open lectures in the fields of demography, mapping and cartography, and geographic information science." Rachel Tobler donated Waldo Tobler's collection of papers and research materials to the UCSB Library, which now hosts them as "The Waldo Tobler Academic Archives". On March 6, 2018, UCSB lowered their flag to honor Tobler after his death.

The journal Geographical Analysis dedicated a special issue titled "In honor of Waldo Tobler", edited by Alan T. Murray and Keith C. Clarke, which contained several articles discussing his research, including discussions and overviews of Tobler's contributions to the journal. The journal Cartography and Geographic Information Science honored Tobler with both an obituary authored by Keith C. Clarke and a graphic composite on the cover featuring themes of his work. Two of the International Cartographic Association journals, (The Cartographic Journal, and the International Journal of Cartography), as well as the journals Imago Mundi, Transactions in GIS, and Annals of GIS honored Tobler with obituary articles. The American Association of Geographers published a memorial for him on their website.

== See also ==
- Cynthia Brewer – American geographer (born 1960)
- Duane Marble – American geographer (1931–2022)
- Geographers on Film – Archival series of interviews with geographers
- George F. Jenks – American geographer and cartographer
- Mei-Po Kwan – Geographer
- Michael Dacey – American geographer and spatial statistician
- Roger Tomlinson – English-Canadian geographer
- Stewart Fotheringham – British-American geographer
- Tobler (name)
