= Scientific Geography Series =

Series of geography publications, 1985–1988

- Author: Various
- Country: United States
- Language: English
- Discipline: Geography
- Publisher: Sage Publications
- Published: 1985-1988
- Media type: Print (Paperback)
- No. of books: 10
- Website: rri.wvu.edu/web-book/scientific-geography-series

The Scientific Geography Series is a series of small books that each focus on a specific geographic concept from a scientific framework.

== Background and influences ==

Geographer Grant Ian Thrall edited the series, and the books were written by prominent geographers such as Arthur Getis and A. Stewart Fotheringham. The term "Scientific geography" dates back at least to a 1910 publication titled Scientific Geography: The Relation of Its Content to Its Subdivisions in the Bulletin of the American Geographical Society (now the Geographical Review). The Scientific Geography Series editor defined the term as involving:

"the precise definition of variables and theoretical relationships that can be shown to be logically consistent. The theories are judged on the clarity of specification of their hypotheses and on their ability to be verified through statistical empirical analysis."

— Grant Ian Thrall,

The series was originally published between 1985 and 1988 and sold for $6.50 per issue. It is intended for use as textbooks or as sources for researchers, and the books can be taken individually or used together to learn concepts in geography. The first books in the series are introductory and focus on human geography, including an issues dedicated to Central place theory and Gravity and Spatial Interaction Models, while later ones are more advanced and focus on scientific or quantitative geography. The series is described as providing "a broad view of developments in academic geography--at least of the more quantitative aspects of its human geography wing."

The Scientific Geography Series was immediately compared to the Concepts and Techniques in Modern Geography (CATMOG) series in a review, where the reviewer called them "Super-CATMOGs," and stated that British users might believe the series was an American attempt at profiting from the publication model set forth by the CATMOGs. The review noted that while CATMOGs were focused on techniques, the Scientific Geography Series was more focused on "theories and models." Multiple reviews noted that the Scientific Geography Series was clearly aimed at American Undergraduate students. Despite the similarities to CATMOG, the reviewer noted that the books published at the time of review were a useful contribution to educational material.

While used extensively, these physical copies became difficult to find and use in the classroom. To remedy this, the West Virginia University Regional Research Institute made digital copies of the series available for free as part of their "Web Book of Regional Science" series.

== List of Publications ==
Number in series	Title	Author	Original publication date	ISBN	Ref
1	Central place theory	Leslie J. King	1985	ISBN 0803923244	
2	Gravity and Spatial Interaction Models	Kingsley E. Haynes and A. Stewart Fotheringham	1985	ISBN 0803923260	
3	Industrial Location	Michael J. Webber	1985	ISBN 0803925468	
4	Regional Population Projection Models	Andrei Rogers	1985	ISBN 0803923740	
5	Spatial Transportation Modeling	Christian Werner	1985	ISBN 080392738X	
6	Regional Input-Output Analysis	Geoffrey J. D. Hewings	1985	ISBN 0803927401	
7	Human Migration	William A. V. Clark	1986	ISBN 0803924879	
8	Point Pattern Analysis	Barry N. Boots and Arthur Getis	1988	ISBN 0803925883	
9	Spatial Autocorrelation	John Odland	1988	ISBN 0803926510	
10	Spatial Diffusion	Richard Morrill, Gary L. Gaile, and Grant Ian Thrall	1988	ISBN 0803928521	

== Criticism ==
Critics of the series have noted that while the series editor claimed coverage of science in geography was limited, there were many prominent publications on the topic. The coverage of some topics is described as being a bit inadequate. As they were small, one reviewer noted that the project was flawed due to the texts being neither cutting-edge research nor full textbooks.

One reviewer noted that the series was very similar in format to the British CATMOGs, but instead targeting American undergraduate students, using American examples, and American academics. The implication was that a large-scale American publishing company was taking the British CATMOG idea, and profiting from it. The cost of the Scientific Geography Series was noted to be more expensive than the CATMOGs.

The term "scientific geography" is described by an author as an "unfortunate term that, I hope, will not gain widespread currency." This is part of a broader problem of organizing geography, with many competing terms that are sometimes used as direct synonyms or in conjuncture with each other within the literature, such as technical geography.

== See also ==
- Geographic Information Science and Technology Body of Knowledge
- Geographia Generalis
- Geographic information systems
- How to Lie with Maps
- Spatial analysis
- Qualitative geography
- Quantitative geography
