= Roger Tomlinson =

English-Canadian geographer

Roger Tomlinson OC FRCGS
- Born: Roger Frank Tomlinson; 17 November 1933; Cambridge, England
- Died: 7 February 2014 (aged 80); San Miguel de Allende, Mexico
- Education: University of Nottingham, Acadia University, McGill University, University College London
- Occupation: Geographer
- Awards: UCGIS Fellow, Order of Canada, Alexander Graham Bell Medal of the National Geographic Society, Gold Medal of the Royal Canadian Geographical Society, Murchison Award of the Royal Geographical Society, honorary Doctorate of Science University of Nottingham, honorary Doctorate of Science Acadia University, honorary Doctorate of Science McGill University, honorary Member of the Association of Ontario Land Surveyors, honorary Doctorate of Science University of Lethbridge, URISA GIS Hall of Fame

Roger Frank Tomlinson OC FRCGS (17 November 1933 – 7 February 2014) was an English-Canadian geographer and the primary originator of modern geographic information systems (GIS), and has been acknowledged as the "father of GIS."

== Biography ==
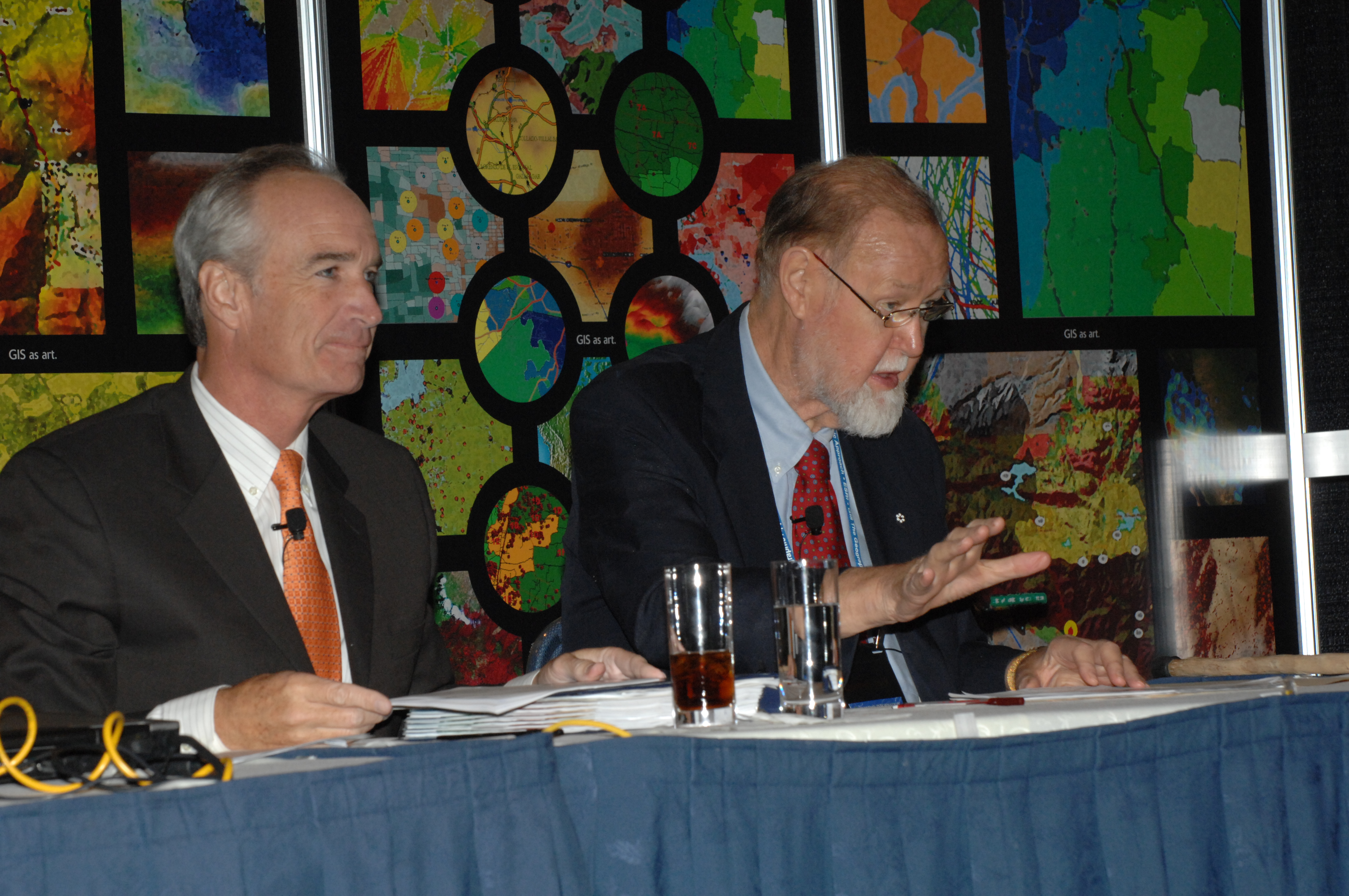
Roger Tomlinson (right), speaking at the 2008 ESRI International User Conference

Roger Tomlinson was a native of Newmarket, England, and prior to attending university, he served in the Royal Air Force from 1951–1954 as a pilot and flying officer.

After his military service, Tomlinson attended the University of Nottingham and Acadia University for two separate undergraduate degrees in geography and geology, respectively. He received a master's degree in geography from McGill University where he specialised in the glacial geomorphology of Labrador. His Doctoral thesis at University College London was titled: The application of electronic computing methods and techniques to the storage, compilation, and assessment of mapped data.

Tomlinson's early career included serving as an assistant professor at Acadia, working as the manager of the computer mapping division at Spartan Air Services in Ottawa, Ontario (following his studies at McGill), and work with the Government of Canada first as a consultant and later as a director of regional planning systems with the Department of Forestry and Rural Development.

It was during his tenure in the 1960s with Ottawa-based aerial survey company Spartan Air Services that Tomlinson conceptualized combining land use mapping with emerging computer technology. This pioneering work led him to initiate, plan and direct the development of the Canada Geographic Information System, the first computerised GIS in the world.

From the 1970s until his death, Tomlinson worked in geographic consulting and research for a variety of private sector, government, and non-profit organisations, largely through his Ottawa-based company, Tomlinson Associates Ltd., which has branches of consulting geographers in Canada, the United States, and Australia.

He was Chairman of the International Geographical Union GIS Commission for 12 years. He pioneered the concepts of worldwide geographical data availability as Chairman of the IGU Global Database Planning Project in 1988. He was also a president of the Canadian Association of Geographers.

== Awards and honours ==
He was recipient of Canadian Association of Geographers rare award for Service to the Profession. The Association of American Geographers in the United States awarded him the James R. Anderson Medal of Honor for Applied Geography in 1995 and he was the first recipient of the Robert T. Aangeenbrug Distinguished Career Award in 2005.

Tomlinson was an Honorary Fellow of the Royal Geographical Society and winner of their Murchison Award for the Development of Geographic Information Systems. In 1996 he was awarded the GIS World Lifetime Achievement Award for a lifetime of work with GIS, and he was the first recipient of the ESRI Lifetime Achievement Award in 1997. In 2004, in recognition of his numerous achievements in the industry, the GIS Certification Institute awarded Tomlinson the GISP Certificate for Lifetime GIS Achievement and he was inducted into URISA's GIS Hall of Fame and awarded lifetime membership. In 2010 Tomlinson received the Alexander Graham Bell Medal of the National Geographic Society (together with Jack Dangermond). In 2011, he was presented with an Honorary Membership in the Association of Ontario Land Surveyors. Tomlinson also received the Geospatial Information & Technology Association Lifetime Achievement Award. In 2013, Tomlinson was awarded a Fellow of the University Consortium for Geographic Information Science.

More recently, he was made a fellow of University College London and received honorary Doctorates of Science from the University of Nottingham, Acadia University, McGill University, and the University of Lethbridge. He was awarded the Gold Medal of the Royal Canadian Geographical Society and was awarded the Order of Canada by the Governor General for "changing the face of geography as a discipline." In 2013, he was promoted to Officer of the Order of Canada by the Governor General.

== See also ==
- Arthur Getis – American geographer and spatial statistician
- Cynthia Brewer – American geographer (born 1960)
- Duane Marble – American geographer (1931–2022)
- George F. Jenks – American geographer and cartographer
- Jack Dangermond – American billionaire businessman
- Michael DeMers – American geographer and fiction writer
- Michael Frank Goodchild – British-American geographer
- Technical geography – Study of spatial information
- Waldo Tobler – American geographer
