= Journal of Geographical Systems =

- Discipline: Geography
- Language: English
- Edited by: M.M. Fischer, A. Páez

Publication details
- History: 1999–present
- Publisher: Springer Science+Business Media
- Frequency: Quarterly
- Impact factor: 2.8 (2025)

Standard abbreviations
- ISO 4: J. Geogr. Syst.

Indexing
- ISSN: 1435-5930 (print); 1435-5949 (web)
- LCCN: 2001227170
- OCLC no.: 472976896

Links
- Journal homepage; Online archive

The Journal of Geographical Systems is a quarterly peer-reviewed academic journal published by Springer Science+Business Media. It covers geographical information, mathematical modeling, analysis, theory, regional science, geography, environmental sciences, planning, and decision. The journal was founded by Manfred M. Fischer and Arthur Getis, who both served as founding editors-in-chief. The current editors-in-chief are Manfred M. Fischer (Vienna University of Economics and Business) and Antonio Páez (McMaster University).

== Abstracting and indexing ==
The journal is abstracted and indexed in:

- Current Contents/Social & Behavioral Sciences
- EBSCO databases
- EconLit
- GEOBASE
- Inspec
- ProQuest databases
- Scopus
- Social Sciences Citation Index

According to the Journal Citation Reports, the journal has a 2025 impact factor of 2.8.
