= Brian Berry =

British-American geographer (1934–2025)

- Born: 16 February 1934; Sedgley, Staffordshire, England
- Died: 2 January 2025 (aged 90); Dodd City, Texas, U.S.
- Education: University College London
- Known for: Quantitative revolution
- Scientific career
- Fields: Geography, City and Regional Planning, Urban and Regional Economics
- Workplaces: University of Texas at Dallas

Brian Joe Lobley Berry (16 February 1934 – 2 January 2025) was a British-American human geographer and city and regional planner. He was the Lloyd Viel Berkner Regental Professor in the School of Economic, Political and Policy Sciences at the University of Texas at Dallas. His urban and regional research in the 1960s sparked geography’s social-scientific revolution and made him the most-cited geographer for more than 25 years.

== Biography ==
Berry was born in Sedgley, Staffordshire, United Kingdom. He was educated at Queen Elizabeth's High School, Gainsborough, Lincolnshire and Acton County Grammar School, Acton, Middlesex, now the Ark Acton Academy. He graduated from University College, London, with a B.Sc. (Economics) degree with first class honors in 1955. With a Fulbright scholarship he went on to the University of Washington where he completed an M.A. in 1956, and a Ph.D. in 1958, studying under noted geographer and leader of the "quantitative revolution" William Garrison in the Department of Geography.

Upon completing his Ph.D., Berry was appointed to the faculty at the University of Chicago, rising to the position of Irving B.Harris Professor of Urban Geography, geography department chair and director of the Center for Urban Studies, positions that he held until 1976. During this time his urban and regional research sparked geography’s social-scientific revolution and made him the most-cited geographer for more than 25 years, known for his refinement of central place theory and for laying the foundations of analytic urban geography, of spatial analysis, and of geographic information science. In 1965 he acquired dual US-UK citizenship. Since 1990 his studies focused on the long-wave theory and its relationships to macrohistorical phasing of economic development and political behavior. He also researched variations in the quality of life ("happiness") across and within nations.

From 1976 to 1981 Berry was the Frank Backus Williams Professor of City and Regional Planning in the Graduate School of Design, chair of the PhD Program in Urban Planning and professor in sociology in the Faculty of Arts and Sciences, director of the Laboratory for Computer Graphics and Spatial Analysis and a faculty fellow of the Institute for International Development at Harvard, and following that was appointed University Professor of Urban Studies and Public Policy and dean of the Heinz College at Carnegie Mellon University for a period of 5 years. In 1986 he joined the University of Texas at Dallas, occupying the Lloyd Viel Berkner Regental Professorship, and becoming founding dean of the School of Economic, Political and Policy Sciences.

Among his honors, Berry was elected a member the National Academy of Sciences in 1975 and a Fellow of the American Academy of Arts and Sciences in 1976. He was also a Fellow of the British Academy and University College London. He was the 1978-79 President of the Association of American Geographers, and among many other awards and recognitions, in 1988 he was awarded the Victoria Medal from the Royal Geographical Society. In 1999 he was elected a member of the Council of the National Academy of Sciences, and in 2004 was a founding member of the Texas Academy of Medicine, Engineering and Science (TAMEST), later serving on its council. In 2005 he was named the Laureat Internationale de Geographie 'Vautrin Lud' (the 'Nobel Prize of Geography') and became a Fellow on the American Institute of Certified Planners, followed thereafter by Fellowship in the Regional Science Association International. In 2017 the International N.D. Kondratieff Foundation named him a Kondratieff Medal Laureate and in 2020, still active, the American Association of Geographers gave him the Stan Brunn Award for Scholarly Creativity. Berry retired from academic life in 2020, and died after a long illness at his home, on 2 January 2025, at the age of 90.

== Publications ==
Berry authored over 550 books and articles, and bridged theory and practice via involvement in urban and regional development activities in both advanced and developing countries. During his career he also was the advisor to more than 150 new PhDs and served on an equal number of other doctoral committees. Many of his students have gone on to successful academic and professional careers in their own right. He was an active family historian and genealogist, with many additional publications to his name, most recently delving into genetic genealogy, where testing by FamilyTreeDNA documents his y-Dna to be the Bell-Beaker R-L21>A5846>A5840>A5835>Y18815>Y42681, which he shared with descendants of John Berry of Honley in Yorkshire (1510-1569), and his mitochondrial DNA to be T2f1a1.

== Sources ==
Brian J.L. Berry, Nihil Sine Labore. An Autobiography. 2006.
