= Michael DeMers =

American geographer and fiction writer

Michael N. DeMers
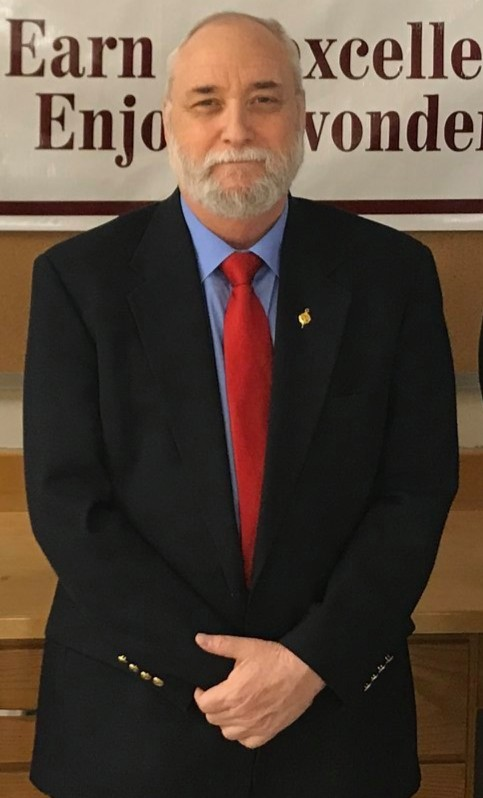
- Michael DeMers at 2019 NMSU Gamma Theta Upsilon initiation ceremony.
- Born: 31 August 1951 (age 75); East Grand Forks, Minnesota
- Occupation: Geographer

Academic background
- Education: University of Kansas
- Thesis: (1985)

Academic work
- Discipline: Geography
- Sub-discipline: geographic information science
- Institutions: New Mexico State University
- Website: https://geography.nmsu.edu/about-us/Faculty_Bios/MikeDeMers/demersbio.html

Michael N. DeMers is a geographer and professor emeritus of geography at New Mexico State University.

== Education and field ==
DeMers obtained a B.S.Ed. in Earth science in 1974 and an M.S. in geography in 1980, both from the University of North Dakota. He earned an M.Phil. in geography in 1983, and a Ph.D. in geography in 1985, both from the University of Kansas. He has taught geography and courses related to geographic information systems (GIS) since 1983, and obtained a GCERT in Online Teaching and Learning from New Mexico State University in 2007.

DeMers specializes in geographic information science (GIScience), including applying it to research in real-world problems in fields such as landscape ecology, researching its theoretical implications, and teaching it to students. He advocates for geographic education in public schools and has researched employing novel technologies.

== Career ==
DeMers became a faculty member in the geography department at New Mexico State University in 1992, and served as department head between 2000 and 2004. He served as president of the National Council for Geographic Education in 2014.

DeMers' research focuses on applying GIS to problems including water resources, big data, and species range expansion. He has contributed significantly to literature involving geographic information science and teaching geospatial concepts with novel technologies. He advocates teaching geography in public schools using geographic information systems and has worked to increase public awareness of GIScience.

=== Publications ===
DeMers has published over seventy-five research articles on geographic topics, authored the Encyclopædia Britannica entry on GIS, and served as an editor, and contributed to, the Geographic Information Science and Technology Body of Knowledge. His works have been cited over 3600 times, giving him an h-index of 21. In addition, he has authored or edited the following books:

- DeMers, Michael (2017). Geographic Information Systems in Action. Wiley. ISBN 978-1119238867.
- DeMers, Michael (2009). GIS for Dummies. Hoboken, New Jersey: John Wiley and Sons Inc. ISBN 978-0-470-23682-6.
- DiBiase, David; DeMers, Michael; Johnson, Ann; Kemp, Karen; Luck, Ann Taylor; Plewe, Brandon; Wentz, Elizabeth (2006). Geographic Information Science and Technology Body of Knowledge. Association of American Geographers. ISBN 978-0-89291-267-4.
- DeMers, Michael (2002). GIS Modeling in Raster. John Wiley and Sons Inc. ISBN 0-471-31965-1. (Translated into Arabic)
- DeMers, Michael (2009). Fundamentals of Geographic Information Systems (4th ed.). John Wiley & Sons, inc. ISBN 978-0-470-12906-7. (translated into Russian and Chinese)

== Awards ==
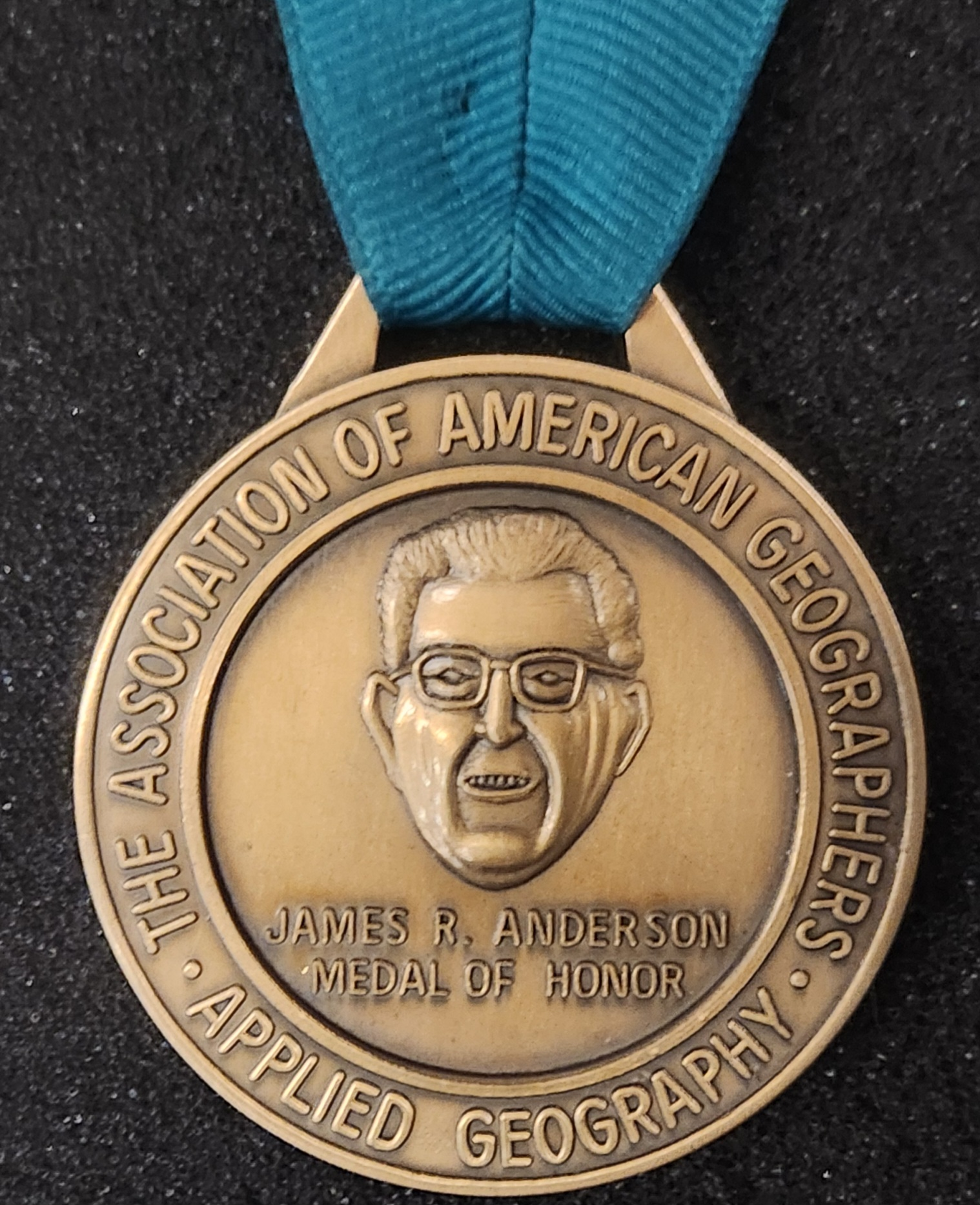
Anderson Medal of Honor in Applied Geography

Over the course of his career, DeMers has received the following awards:

- The University Consortium for Geographic Information Science Lifetime Achievement in GIScience Education Award, 2023
- New Mexico Geographic Information Council Wheeler Peak Lifetime Achievement Award, 2018
- Distinguished Alumni Award, University of North Dakota, 2013
- Anderson Medal of Honor in Applied Geography "for exceptional accomplishments in applied geography education, research, and service to the profession and the wider public, 2010."
- Highest Award for Achievement, Dale Carnegie Training, Fall, 2003.

== Philanthropy ==
Demers established the "Duane Marble Award for GIS Design and Education Research" at NMSU in 2010 to recognize the work and contributions of his friend and fellow GIScientist Duane Marble. It was awarded to NMSU graduate students whose thesis focused on novel applications to GIS, or to GIS education.

== Personal life ==
DeMers grew up in East Grand Forks, Minnesota. After retiring, he began writing fantasy novels. The first of these to be published is the book Young Vandar.

== See also ==
- Quantitative geography – Subfield of geographic methods
- Technical geography – Study of spatial information
- Gamma Theta Upsilon – International geography honor society
