= Geographic Information Science and Technology Body of Knowledge =

The Geographic Information Science and Technology Body of Knowledge (GISTBoK) is a reference document produced by the University Consortium for Geographic Information Science (UCGIS) as the first product of its Model Curricula project, started in 1997 by Duane Marble and a select task force, and completed in 2006 by David DiBiase and a team of editors.

== Overview ==
The GISTBoK is the most successful effort to date to create a comprehensive outline of the concepts and skills unique to the geospatial realm, including geographic information systems, geographic information science, remote sensing, satellite navigation systems, and cartography. However, it is missing some topics, such as geocoding, and has significant granularity issues: large, mature subfields such as surveying, GPS, and remote sensing are covered in small sections, while the relatively immature field of geocomputation is granted an entire knowledge area. There is also opposition to the document as a whole, especially from the critical GIS community, on the grounds that the discipline is too diverse and too subjective to be so easily encapsulated. The editors have acknowledged these shortcomings, and have expressed hope that wider input on future editions will solve some of these issues.

The GISTBoK is intended to be used in a variety of applications, including curriculum design, educational assessment, educational program accreditation, professional certification, hiring practices, and project RFP's. All of these activities are elements of the current trend toward regulation and standardization of the geospatial professions, and much of the opposition to the Body of Knowledge comes from those opposed to this trend, especially in academia, who feel that GIS&T is too diverse, interdisciplinary, and subjective to be regulated. One counterargument to this opposition is that the body of knowledge approach enables a flexible form of regulation that accommodates a diversity of skills and viewpoints.

The GISTBoK is patterned after the Computing Curricula project of the Association for Computing Machinery, and other model curriculum projects. It is essentially a hierarchical outline, composed of Knowledge Areas, broken down into Units, further divided into Topics. Each topic includes a list of 5–10 educational objectives that exemplify a person with varying levels of knowledge and skill. It does not include an encyclopaedic description of each topic.

The first edition was co-sponsored by UCGIS and several major vendors (ESRI, Intergraph, and GE Smallworld), and was published in August 2006 by the Association of American Geographers.

== See also ==
- Body of knowledge
- Concepts and Techniques in Modern Geography
- Geographia Generalis
- How to Lie with Maps
- Scientific Geography Series
- Technical geography
- Quantitative geography
