= Transactions in GIS =

Academic journal in geographic information science

- Discipline: Geographic information science
- Language: English
- Edited by: John P. Wilson

Publication details
- History: 1996-present
- Publisher: Wiley (United Kingdom)
- Impact factor: 2.4 (2025)

Standard abbreviations
- ISO 4: Trans. GIS

Indexing
- ISSN: 1361-1682 (print); 1467-9671 (web)

Links
- Journal homepage; Online access; Online archive

Transactions in GIS is a peer-reviewed academic journal covering geographic information science and the spatial sciences. Established in 1996, it is published by Wiley and edited by John P. Wilson (University of Southern California). The journal publishes research articles, review articles, and short technical notes.

== History ==
Transactions in GIS's first volume was published in 1996, with John P. Wilson, Pip Forer, and Stewart Fotheringham serving as the journal's editors. The journal was initially published by GeoInformation International in Cambridge, England. Following the breakup and sale of GeoInformation International, Blackwell Science acquired the journal in 1998.

== Scope ==
The journal covers the organization, representation, storage, analysis, modeling, and visualization of geographic information. Its scope includes geographic information systems, the Global Positioning System (GPS), remote sensing, spatial data infrastructures and databases, geocomputation, spatiotemporal analysis, spatial data quality and uncertainty, and the societal aspects of geographic information systems.

== Abstracting and indexing ==
Transactions in GIS is abstracted and indexed in Scopus, the Social Sciences Citation Index, Current Contents/Social & Behavioral Sciences, and EBSCO Academic Search. According to the Journal Citation Reports, the journal has a 2025 impact factor of 2.4.

== See also ==
- Geographic information science
- Journal of Spatial Information Science
- Geographical Analysis
