= Geocomputation =

Geocomputation (also spelled GeoComputation) is a field of study at the intersection of geography and computation.

== See also ==
- Geoinformatics
- Geomathematics
- Geographic information system

== Bibliography ==
- Openshaw, S., and R. J. Abrahart. (1996). “Geocomputation.” In Proceedings of the 1st International Conference on GeoComputation, 665–6, edited by R. J. Abrahart. Leeds, U.K.: University of Leeds
- Longley, P. A., S. M. Brooks, R. McDonnell, and W. D. Macmillan. (1998). Geocomputation: A Primer. Chichester, U.K.: John Wiley & Sons
- Gahegan, M. (1999). “Guest Editorial: What is Geocomputation?” Transactions in GIS 3(3), 203–6.
- Brunsdon, C., and A. D. Singleton. (2015). Geocomputation: A Practical Primer. London: Sage
- Harris, R., D. O’Sullivan, M. Gahegan, M. Charlton, L. Comber, P. Longley, C. Brunsdon, N. Malleson, A. Heppenstall, A. Singleton, D. Arribas-Bel, and A. Evans. (2017). “More Bark than Bytes? Reflections on 21+ Years of Geocomputation.” Environment and Planning B 44(4), 598–617.
