= City and regional planning =

City and regional planning encompasses the following:

- "City" or "urban" planning
- Regional planning

== See also ==
- Land-use planning
- Landscape architecture
