= Quantitative revolution =

Paradigm shift in geography

In geography, the quantitative revolution (QR) (Note: During the 1940s–1970s, it was customary to capitalize generalized concept names, especially in philosophy ("Truth, Kindness, Beauty"), plus using capital letters when naming ideologies, movements, or schools of thought. Example: "the Automobile" as a concept, versus "the automobile in a garage") was a paradigm shift that sought to develop a more rigorous and systematic methodology for the discipline. It came as a response to the inadequacy of regional geography to explain general spatial dynamics. The main claim for the quantitative revolution is that it led to a shift from a descriptive (idiographic) geography to an empirical law-making (nomothetic) geography. The quantitative revolution occurred during the 1950s and 1960s and marked a rapid change in the method behind geographical research, from regional geography into a spatial science.

In the history of geography, the quantitative revolution was one of the four major turning points of modern geography – the other three being environmental determinism, regional geography and critical geography. It contributed to the technical geography branch of the discipline, culminating in the emergence of quantitative geography, which includes geographic information science, geoinformatics, and spatial analysis.

The quantitative revolution had occurred earlier in economics and psychology and contemporaneously in political science and other social sciences and to a lesser extent in history.

== Antecedents ==
During the late 1940s and early 1950s:

- The regional tradition, which believed the objective of geography was to describe and explain the areal differentiation of the Earth's surface, dominated geography studies.
- The closing of many geography departments and courses in universities took place, most notably, the abolition of the geography program at Harvard University (a highly prestigious institution) in 1948 was seen as an “academic war over the field of geography".
- There was a continuing division between human and physical geography – general talk of human geography becoming an autonomous subject.
- Geography was regarded as overly descriptive and unscientific – it was claimed that there was no explanation of why processes or phenomena occurred.
- Geography was seen as exclusively educational and "not a university subject" – there were few if any applications of contemporary geography.
- Continuing debates regarding what geography is – science, art, humanity or social science – took place.
- After World War II, technology became increasingly important in society, and as a result, nomothetic-based sciences gained popularity and prominence.

All of these events presented a threat to geography's position as an academic subject, and thus geographers began seeking new methods to counter critique.

== The Revolution ==
The quantitative revolution responded to the regional geography paradigm that was dominant at the time. Debates raged predominantly (although not exclusively) in the U.S., where regional geography was the major philosophical school. In the early 1950s, there was a growing sense that the existing paradigm for geographical research was not adequate in explaining how physical, economic, social, and political processes are spatially organized, ecologically related, or how outcomes generated by them are evidence for a given time and place. A growing number of geographers started to express their dissatisfaction with the traditional paradigm of the discipline and its focus on regional geography, deeming the work as too descriptive, fragmented, and non-generalizable. To address these concerns, early critics such as Ackerman suggested the systematization of the discipline. Soon thereafter, a series of debates regarding methodological approaches in geography took place. One of the first illustrations of this was the Schaefer vs. Hartshorne debate. In 1953 Exceptionalism in geography: A Methodological Examination was published. In this work, Schaefer rejected Hartshorne's exceptionalist interpretations about the discipline of geography and having the region as its central object of study. Instead, Schaefer envisioned as the discipline's main objective the establishment of morphological laws through scientific inquiry, i.e. incorporating laws and methods from other disciplines in the social sciences that place a greater emphasis on processes. Hartshorne, on the other hand, addressed Schaefer's criticism in a series of publications, where he dismissed Schaefer's views as subjective and contradictory. He also stressed the importance of describing and classifying places and phenomena, yet admitted that there was room for employing laws of generic relationships in order to maximize scientific understanding. In his view, however, there should be no hierarchy between these two approaches.

While debates about methods carried on, the institutionalization of systematic geography was taking place in the U.S. academy. The geography programs at the University of Iowa, University of Wisconsin–Madison, and the University of Washington were pioneering programs in that respect. At the University of Iowa, Harold McCarty led efforts to establish laws of association between geographical patterns. At the University of Wisconsin, Arthur H. Robinson led efforts to develop statistical methods for map comparison. And at the University of Washington, Edward Ullman and William Garrison worked on developing the field of economic and urban geography, and central place theory. Graduate students from the University of Washington, such as William Bunge, Artur Getis, and Waldo R. Tobler expanded on this work throughout their careers, with Bunge's book Theoretical Geography "described as "perhaps the seminal text of the spatial-quantitative revolution." These institutions engendered a generation of geographers that established spatial analysis as part of the research agenda at other institutions including University of Chicago, Northwestern University, Loyola University, Ohio State University, the University of Michigan, among others.

The changes introduced during the 1950s and 1960s under the banner of bringing 'scientific thinking' to geography led to an increased use of technique-based practices, including an array of mathematical techniques and computerized statistics that improved precision, and theory-based practices to conceptualize location and space in geographical research.

Some of the techniques that epitomize the quantitative revolution include:

- Descriptive statistics;
- Inferential statistics;
- Basic mathematical equations and models, such as gravity model of social physics, or the Coulomb equation;
- Stochastic models using concepts of probability, such as spatial diffusion processes;
- Deterministic models, e.g. Von Thünen's and Weber's location models.

The common factor, linking the above techniques, was a preference for numbers over words and a belief that numerical work had a superior scientific pedigree. Ron Johnston and colleagues at the University of Bristol have published a history of the revolution that stresses changes in substantive focus and philosophical underpinnings as well as methods.

== Epistemological underpinnings ==
The new method of inquiry led to the development of generalizations about spatial aspects in a wide range of natural and cultural settings. Generalizations may take the form of tested hypotheses, models, or theories, and the research is judged on its scientific validity, turning geography into a nomothetic science.

One of the most significant works to provide a legitimate theoretical and philosophical foundation for the reorientation of geography into a spatial science was David Harvey's book, Explanation in Geography, published in 1969. In this work, Harvey laid out two possible methodologies to explain geographical phenomena: an inductive route where generalizations are made from observation; and a deductive one where, through empirical observation, testable models and hypothesis are formulated and later verified to become scientific laws. He placed preference on the latter method. This positivist approach was countered by critical rationalism, a philosophy advanced by Karl Popper who rejected the idea of verification and maintained that hypothesis can only be falsified. Both epistemological philosophies, however, sought to achieve the same objective: to produce scientific laws and theories.

The paradigm shift had its strongest repercussions in the sub-field of economic and urban geography, especially as it pertains to location theory. However, some geographers–such as Ian Burton–expressed their dissatisfaction with quantification while others – such as Emrys Jones, Peter Lewis, and Golledge and Amedeo – debated the feasibility of law-making. Others, such as F. Luckermann, criticized the scientific explanations offered in geography as conjectural and lacking empirical basis. As a result, even models that were tested failed to accurately depict reality.

By the mid-1960s the quantitative revolution had successfully displaced regional geography from its dominant position and the paradigm shift was evident by the myriad of publications in geographical academic journals and geography textbooks. The adoption of the new paradigm allowed the discipline to be more serviceable to the public and private sectors.

== Post-revolution geography ==
The quantitative revolution had enormous implications in shaping the discipline of geography into what it looks like today given that its effects led to the spread of positivist (post-positivist) thinking and counter-positivist responses.

The rising interest in the study of distance as a critical factor in understanding the spatial arrangement of phenomena during the revolution led to the formulation of the first law of geography by Waldo Tobler. The development of spatial analysis in geography led to more applications in planning process and the further development of technical geography offered to geographical research a necessary theoretical background.

The greater use of computers in geography also led to many new developments in geomatics, such as the creation and application of GIS and remote sensing. These new developments allowed geographers for the first time to assess complex models on a full-scale model and over space and time and the relationship between spatial entities. To some extent, the development of geomatics helped obscure the binary between physical and human geography, as the complexities of the human and natural environments could be assessed on new computable models.

=== Criticism and responses ===
The limited focus on statistical modeling brought about by the quantitative revolution has led to concerns that the techniques remove the 'human dimension' from a discipline. As the 1970s dawned, the quantitative revolution came under direct challenge. The counter-positivist response came as geographers began to expose the inadequacy of quantitative methods to explain and address issues regarding race, gender, class and war. David Harvey disregarded earlier works where he advocated for the quantitative revolution and adopted a Marxist theoretical framework. Soon new subfields would emerge in human geography to contribute a new vocabulary for addressing these issues, including critical geography and feminist geography. These fields have attempted to appropriate quantitative methods to address the focus of their study. One commentator described this as "an extraordinary contribution. This is a panoramic survey of the legacy of half a century of innovation in spatial science—put into a critical, constructive engagement with half a century of innovation in critical social theory".

There have been many responses to these criticisms, and counter criticisms of the new fields that have emerged in response to the quantitative revolution. These include that the critics of new methods do not understand them, are criticizing earlier work, or are advocating for non-scientific approaches. While many would claim the quantitative revolution was replaced by the new paradigms, and that the arguments are a thing of the past, it is perhaps better described as a split with quantitative geography and qualitative geography both coexisting and continuing to borrow from each other's research. Barnes pointed out that there is no real contradiction between quantitative geography and critical geography, citing that even the "ultimate social critic", Karl Marx, attached great importance to mathematical methods.

== See also ==
- Cultural turn
- Environmental determinism
- Geostatistics
- History of geography
- Positivism
- Quantitative methods
- Regional geography
- Regional science
- Scientific method
- Vautrin Lud Prize
