= William Garrison (geographer) =

American geographer (1924–2015)

- Born: William Louis Garrison; April 20, 1924; Tennessee, U.S.
- Died: February 1, 2015 (aged 90); Lafayette, California, U.S.
- Education: University of Washington; Northwestern University (PhD)
- Known for: Quantitative revolution
- Spouse: Marcia Garrison
- Children: 4
- Scientific career
- Fields: Geography, transportation engineering
- Workplaces: University of Washington; Northwestern University; University of Pennsylvania; University of Illinois Urbana-Champaign; University of Pittsburgh; University of California, Berkeley
- Doctoral students: Arthur Getis; Duane Marble; Waldo Tobler

William Louis Garrison (April 20, 1924 – February 1, 2015) was an American geographer, transportation analyst and professor at the University of California, Berkeley. While at the Department of Geography, University of Washington in the 1950s, Garrison led the "quantitative revolution" in geography, which applied computers and statistics to the study of spatial problems. As such, he was one of the founders of regional science. Many of his students (dubbed the "space cadets") went on to become noted professors themselves, including: Brian Berry, Ronald Boyce, Duane Marble, Richard Morrill, John Nystuen, William Bunge, Michael Dacey, Arthur Getis, and Waldo Tobler. His transportation work focused on innovation, the deployment of modes and logistic curves, alternative vehicles and the future of the car.

== Education ==
Garrison attended the University of Washington and received his PhD from Northwestern University in 1950.

== Books by Garrison ==
- Studies of Highway Development and Geographic Change (with Brian Berry, Duane Marble, John Nystuen, and Richard Morrill) Greenwood Press, New York. (1959)
- Tomorrow's Transportation: Changing Cities, Economies, and Lives (with Jerry Ward) ISBN 1-58053-096-6, 2000
- The Transportation Experience: Policy, Planning, and Deployment (with David M. Levinson) ISBN 0-19-517250-7, 2005
- The Transportation Experience: Policy, Planning, and Deployment (with David M. Levinson) (Revised, re-organized, and expanded version of 2005 volume). Oxford and New York: Oxford University Press. ISBN 978-0199862719, 2014

== Important papers ==
- Berry, B.. and Garrison, W. L. 1958: "The functional bases of the central place hierarchy". Economic Geography 34, 145 – 54.
