= University Consortium for Geographic Information Science =

The University Consortium for Geographic Information Science (UCGIS) is an academic non-profit organization dedicated to geographic information science, incorporated in 1995 in Washington, D.C.

It fosters multidisciplinary cooperation among the academic disciplines of cartography, cognitive science, computer science, engineering and land surveying, environmental sciences, geodetic science, geography, landscape architecture, law and public policy, remote sensing and photogrammetry, as well as statistics.

== Education Award ==
The UCGIS Innovation in GIScience Education Award has been offered since 2020 in even-numbered years.

== See also ==
- Geographic Information Science and Technology Body of Knowledge
- National Center for Geographic Information and Analysis
