= Michael Peterson (geographer) =

American geographer and cartographer

Michael P. Peterson
- Born: Wisconsin
- Education: University of Wisconsin - River Falls (B.A., 1976) Boston University (M.A., 1978) State University of New York-Buffalo (Ph.D., 1982)
- Alma mater: State University of New York-Buffalo, Boston University, University of Wisconsin
- Occupation(s): Geographer, Professor

Michael P. Peterson is an American geographer and cartographer whose fields of research include geographic information systems and computer cartography in relation to the Internet and World Wide Web. He is currently a professor at the University of Nebraska Omaha. He was also the president of the North American Cartographic Information Society between 1996 and 1997, as well as the editor of the journal Cartographic Perspectives from 1998 to 2001.

== Education and field ==
Peterson has a Ph.D. in geography from State University of New York-Buffalo, a master's in geography from Boston University, and a B.A. in Earth Science from the University of Wisconsin. He completed his Ph.D. in 1982, his masters in 1978, and his B.A. in 1976. His research primarily focuses on implementation of GIS and computer cartography, especially as related to the internet.

== Career ==
=== Academic ===
Peterson's first academic position was a postdoctoral assistantship at the University of Zurich between 1981 and 1982. He then became an assistant professor at the University of Nebraska Omaha in 1982, where he became a full professor in 1997. He has since remained a professor at the University of Nebraska. He has held visiting, adjunct, and research collaboration positions at other institutions worldwide including the University of Canterbury and TU Wien.

=== Research ===
Peterson's research has focused on developing and understanding cartographic and GIS practices, ethics, and applications. Peterson has investigated topics including animated mapping, computer cartography, and distributed GIS.

=== Professional service ===
Peterson was vice president of the North American Cartographic Information Society from 1995 to 1996 and president of the organization from 1996 to 1997. He has also held leadership positions in the journal Cartography and Geographic Information Science and chaired an International Cartographic Association commission on maps and the internet.

== Publications ==
Peterson wrote entries for choropleth mapping, isoline, and Web GIS in the Encyclopedia of Geographic Information Science. He has also authored or served as an editor for books including:

- Peterson, Michael P. (2017). Advances in Cartography and GIScience (1 ed.). Springer. ISBN 978-3-319-86137-1.
- Peterson, Michael P. (2014). Mapping in the Cloud. New York: The Guiford Press. ISBN 978-1-4625-1041-2. OCLC 855580732.
- Peterson, Michael P. (2012). Online Maps with APIs and WebServices (Lecture Notes in Geoinformation and Cartography Book 0) (1 ed.). Springer. ISBN 978-3642274848.
- Peterson, Michael P. (2008). International Perspectives on Maps and the Internet: An Introduction. Berlin, Heidelberg: Springer. ISBN 978-3-540-72028-7.
- Gartner, George; Cartwright, William; Peterson, Michael P. (2007). Location Based Services and TeleCartography (1 ed.). Berlin, Heidelberg: Springer. ISBN 978-3-540-36727-7.
- Cartwright, William; Peterson, Michael P.; Gartner, George (2006). Multimedia Cartography (1 ed.). Springer. ISBN 978-3540366508.
- Peterson, Michael P. (2003). Maps and the Internet (1 ed.). Pergamon. ISBN 978-0080442013.
- Peterson, Michael P. (1995). Interactive and Animated Cartography. Prentice Hall. ISBN 978-0130791047.

== Awards and recognition ==
Peterson's awards include an Honorary Fellowship from the International Cartographic Association in 2011, the 2008 Higher Education Distinguished Teaching Award from the National Council for Geographic Education, and the 2000 Distinguished Service Award from the North American Cartographic Information Society (NACIS).

== See also ==
- Brandon Plewe – American historical geographer
- Cynthia Brewer – American geographer
- Michael Frank Goodchild – British-American geographer
