= Brandon Plewe =

American historical geographer

Brandon S. Plewe
- Citizenship: United States of America
- Education: University at Buffalo, Brigham Young University
- Occupation: Geographer

Brandon S. Plewe is a geographer and Associate Professor of geography at Brigham Young University.

== Education and field ==
Plewe earned his Ph.D. in geography from the State University of New York at Buffalo in 1997. He specializes in Historical geography and historical GIS, applying it to research on topics such as the history of Utah and The Church of Jesus Christ of Latter-day Saints. Plewe was an early contributor to the body of literature surrounding web mapping and web GIS, and has participated in projects that have had tremendous influence on the discipline of Geographic Information Science.

- Ph.D., Geography, State University of New York at Buffalo, 1997
- Master of Arts, Geography, State University of New York at Buffalo, 1995
- Bachelor of Science., Cartography/Mathematics, Brigham Young University, 1992

== Career and publications ==
=== Academic ===
Plewe has been a professor at Brigham Young University since 1996 and has been an associate professor since 2014. He has taught geography and courses related to Geographic information systems there since 1997. He served as the president of the North American Cartographic Information Society (NACIS) between 2008 and 2009. He served as the president of the Cartography and Geographic Information Society (CaGIS) between 2005 and 2006.

He has been an author of at least fifteen peer-reviewed journal articles and served as an editor on and contributed to the Geographic Information Science and Technology Body of Knowledge (GISTBoK). These contributions included creating the cover design of the GISTBoK. His publications have centered geographically on the history of Utah and The Church of Jesus Christ of Latter-day Saints. His primary focus has been on historical GIS, and his publication titled “The nature of uncertainty in historical geographic information” is listed as one of the “Key readings in Conceptual Foundations” within the GISTBoK. He has authored several books, atlases, and book chapters, including:

- Mapping Mormonism: An Atlas of Latter-day Saint History
- Property Transactions in Nauvoo, Hancock County, Illinois, and Surrounding Communities, 1839-1859
- GIS Online: Information Retrieval, Mapping, and the Internet

=== Non-Academic ===
In addition to Plewe's academic career, he has worked as a tour guide for the company "Utah Luxury Tours."

== Awards and recognition ==
Plewe has won numerous awards for his maps, atlases, and service.

These include:

- Best Professional Map, Utah Geographic Information Council (2014)
- Best Atlas of 2012, Cartography and Geographic Information Society
- Best Book Award, 2012, Mormon History Association
- Best Atlas of 2011, Cartography and Geographic Information Society

== Personal life ==
Plewe grew up in St. George, Utah. He is married and has five children. He is active in the LDS church. He enjoys hiking and is committed to trail preservation.

== See also ==
- Anne Kelly Knowles
- Cartographic design
- Michael DeMers
- Michael Peterson (geographer)
- Quantitative geography
- Typography (cartography)
- Technical geography
- Thematic map
- Visual variable
