= Waldo Tobler bibliography =

Geographer Waldo Tobler's publications

Waldo Rudolph Tobler bibliography
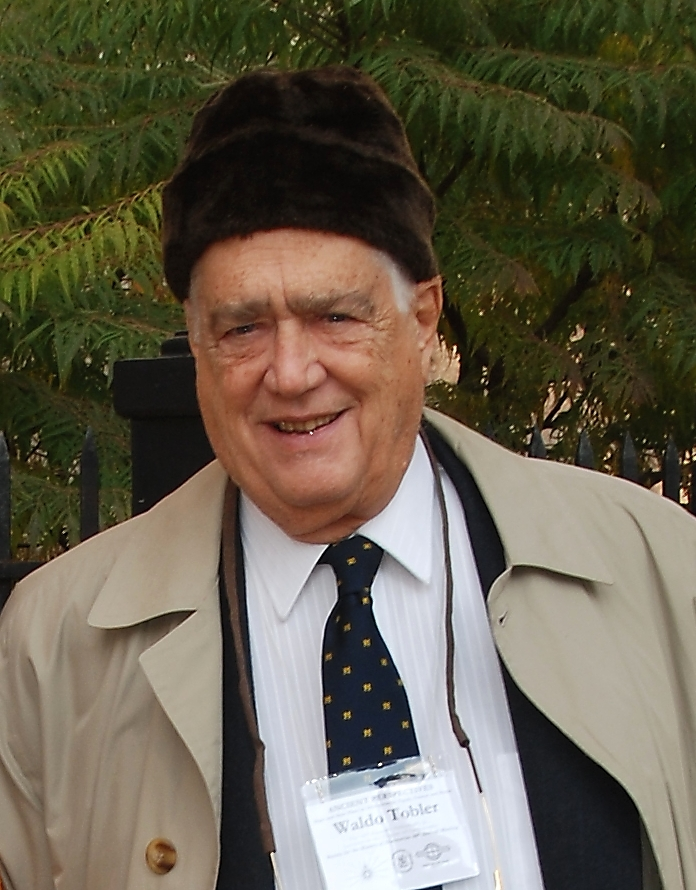
- Waldo Tobler in front of the Newberry Library. Chicago, November 2007.

Waldo Tobler's (November 16, 1930 – February 20, 2018) publications span between 1957 and 2017, with his most productive year being 1973. Despite retirement in 1994, he continued to be involved with research for the remainder of his life. Most of his publications consist of peer-reviewed journals, without single-issue textbooks or monographs, and the quantity of publications is noted as being unremarkable compared to modern geographers. Many of his works are foundational to modern geography and cartography, and still frequently cited in modern publications, including the first paper on using computers in cartography, the establishment of analytical cartography, and coining Tobler's first and second laws of geography. His work covered a wide range of topics, with many of his papers considered to be "cartographic classics", that serve as required reading for both graduate and undergraduate students.

The Library of Congress maintains some of Tobler's early work in "The Waldo Tobler Collection," and the UC Santa Barbara Library maintains a collection of his material donated by his widow in "The Waldo Tobler Academic Archives." During his life, there were several book chapters dedicated to discussing him, and an entry in the twentieth-century volume of the History of Cartography. Many of his publications were included in "select publications" or "key readings" section in these chapters. After his death, several articles in his honor discussed his publications, including a review of all his publications in the journal "Geographic Analysis".

== Peer-reviewed articles ==
=== Single author ===
Title	Date	Journal/publication	Identifier	Citation(s)	Notes
The Multiple Use Concept in Cartography	1957	The Professional Geographer	doi:10.1111/j.0033-0124.1957.095_5.x		
Automation and Cartography	1959	The Geographical Review	doi:10.2307/212211		(Note: This publication is noted as one of the first discussions of using computers to aid in cartography.)
World Map on a Moebius Strip	1961	Surveying and Mapping			
Tissot's Indicatrix and Photogrammetry	1962	Photogrammetric Engineering	Link		
A Classification of Map Projections	1962	Annals of the Association of American Geographers	doi:10.1111/j.1467-8306.1962.tb00403.x		
The Polar Case of Hammer's Projection	1962	The Professional Geographer	doi:10.1111/j.0033-0124.1962.142_20.x		
Geographic Area and Map Projections	1963	The Geographical Review	doi:10.2307/212809		(Note: Later reprinted in "Spatial Analysis" LCCN 6801085 6-801085. Several translations.)
Geographic Ordering of Information	1963	The Canadian Geographer	doi:10.1111/j.1541-0064.1963.tb00806.x		
A Comparison of Spherical and Ellipsoidal Values	1964	The Professional Geographer	doi:10.1111/j.0033-0124.1964.009_q.x		
Automation in the preparation of thematic maps	1965	The Cartographic Journal	doi:10.1179/caj.1965.2.1.32		(Note: Also published as "L'Automation dans la preparation des cartes thematiques" in the International Yearbook of Cartography, 6)
Medieval Distortions: The Projections of Ancient Maps	1965	Annals of the Association of American Geographers	doi:10.1111/j.1467-8306.1966.tb00562.x		
Computation of the correspondence of geographical patterns	1965	Papers in Regional Science	doi:10.1007/BF01947869		
Notes on Two Projections	1966	The Cartographic Journal	doi:10.1179/caj.1966.3.2.87		(Note: On Loximuthal projection and Two-point equidistant projection)
Of Maps and Matrices	1967	Journal of Regional Science			
Computer Use in Geography	1967	Behavioral Science	doi:10.1002/bs.3830120108		
Satellite Confirmation of Settlement Size Coefficients	1969	Area	doi:10.3133/ofr69285		
Geographical Filters and their Inverse	1969	Geographical analysis	doi:10.1111/j.1538-4632.1969.tb00621.x		
A Computer Movie Simulating Urban Growth in the Detroit Region	1970	Economic Geography	doi:10.2307/143141		(Note: First use of Tobler's first law of geography.)
Regional Analysis: Time Series Extended to Two Dimensions	1973	Geographia Polonica			
The hyperelliptical and other new pseudocylindrical equal area map projections	1973	Journal of Geophysical Research	doi:10.1029/JB078i011p01753		(Note: Introduced the family of Tobler hyperelliptical projections.)
A Continuous Transformation Useful for Districting	1973	Annals of the New York Academy of Sciences	doi:10.1111/j.1749-6632.1973.tb41401.x		
Choropleth Maps Without Class Intervals?	1973	Geographical analysis	doi:10.1111/j.1538-4632.1973.tb01012.x		(Note: formally introducing the unclassed scheme to choropleth maps.)
Local Map Projections	1974	The American Cartographer	doi:10.1559/152304074784107827		
A Computer Program to Draw Perspective Views of Geographical Data	1974	The American Cartographer			
A Preliminary Analysis of the Spread of the Depression	1975	Geographical analysis	doi:10.1111/j.1538-4632.1975.tb01055.x		
Analytical Cartography	1976	The American Cartographer	doi:10.1559/152304076784080230		
The Comparison of Plane Forms	1978	Geographical analysis	doi:10.1111/j.1538-4632.1978.tb00004.x		
Comparing Figures by Regression	1978	Computer Graphics	doi:10.1145/965139.807389		
A Proposal for an Equal Area Map of the Entire World on Mercator's Projection	1978	The American Cartographer	doi:10.1559/152304078784022827		
A Transformational View of Cartography	1978	The American Cartographer	doi:10.1559/152304079784023104		
Lattice Tuning	1979	Geographical analysis	doi:10.1111/j.1538-4632.1979.tb00671.x		
A Geographical Migration Probability Density Function	1979	Ontario Geography			
Smooth Pycnophylactic Interpolation for Geographical Regions	1979	Journal of the American Statistical Association	doi:10.1080/01621459.1979.10481647		(Note: This paper coined the word "pycnophylactic".)
Estimation of Attractivities from Interactions	1979	Environment and Planning A	doi:10.1068/a110121		
Depicting Federal Fiscal Transfers	1981	The Professional Geographer	doi:10.1111/j.0033-0124.1981.00419.x		
A Model of Geographic Movement	1981	Geographical analysis	doi:10.1111/j.1538-4632.1981.tb00711.x		
An Alternate Formulation for Spatial Interaction Modeling	1983	Environment and Planning A	doi:10.1068/a150693		
The Morphology of Geographical Change	1985	Ontario Geography			
Derivation of a Spatially Continuous Transportation Model	1985	Transportation Research	doi:10.1016/0191-2607(85)90024-X		
Polycylindric Map Projections	1986	The American Cartographer	doi:10.1559/152304086783900040		
Pseudo–Cartograms	1986	The American Cartographer	doi:10.1559/152304086783900194		
Measuring the Similarity of Map Projections"	1986	The American Cartographer	doi:10.1559/152304086783900103		
The geographic movement of wealth in the United States	1986	MappeMonde	doi:10.3406/mappe.1986.2329		
Experiments in Migration Mapping by Computer	1987	The American Cartographer	doi:10.1559/152304087783875273		
Spherical Quadrilateral to Map Scale Conversion	1989	The American Cartographer	doi:10.1559/152304089783875640		
An Update to 'Numerical Map Generalization	1989	Cartographica	doi:10.3138/U2U2-K560-4L26-2663		
Visual Evidence for Urban Potential Fields	1991	MappeMonde	doi:10.3406/mappe.1991.1908		
Bidimensional Regression	1994	Geographical analysis	doi:10.1111/j.1538-4632.1994.tb00320.x		
The Resel Based GIS"	1995	International Journal of Geographical Information Science	doi:10.1080/02693799508902027		
Migration: Ravenstein, Thornthwaite, and Beyond	1995	Urban Geography	doi:10.2747/0272-3638.16.4.327		
A Graphical Introduction to Survey Adjustment	1996	Cartographica	doi:10.3138/E157-8650-4G3V-MH80		
The Equidominance Line: A New Geopolitical Concept	1997	Applied Geographical Studies	doi:10.1002/(SICI)1520-6319(199721)1:1<7::AID-AGS2>3.0.CO;2-5		
Movement Modeling on the Sphere	1997	Geographical & Environmental Modeling			
Introductory Comments on Information Theory & Cartography	1997	Cartographic Perspectives	doi:10.14714/CP27.698		
Alternatives to Miller's Projection	1997	Cartography and Geographic Information Science	doi:10.1559/152304097782439358		
World Population in a grid of Spherical Quadrangles	1997	Int. J. Population Geography	doi:10.1002/(SICI)1099-1220(199709)3:3<203::AID-IJPG68>3.0.CO;2-C		
Linear pycnophylactic reallocation comment on a paper by D. Martin	1999	International Journal of Geographical Information Science	doi:10.1080/136588199241472		(Note: First use of Tobler's second law of geography.)
The Development of Analytical Cartography: a personal note	2000	Cartography and Geographic Information Science	doi:10.1559/152304000783547867		
Spherical Measures without Spherical Trigonometry	2001	Solstice: An Electronic Journal of Geography and Mathematics,			
Qibla, and Related, Map Projections	2002	Cartography and Geographic Information Science	doi:10.1559/152304002782064574		
Global Spatial Analysis	2002	Computers, Environment, and Urban Systems	doi:10.1016/S0198-9715(02)00017-0		(Note: Editorial)
Thirty-Five Years of Computer Cartogram	2004	Annals of the Association of American Geographers	doi:10.1111/j.1467-8306.2004.09401004.x		
On the First Law of Geography: A Reply	2004	Annals of the Association of American Geographers	doi:10.1111/j.1467-8306.2004.09402009.x		(Note: Second appearance of Tobler's second law of geography. Tobler also mentions Arbia's law of geography.)
Estimating Potentials from Asymmetry	2005	Solstice A refereed Electronic Journal of Geography and Mathematics			
Unusual Map Projections	2008	Cartographic Perspectives	doi:10.14714/CP59.246		
The Curious Case Of 2½ D	2015	Quaestiones Geographicae	doi:10.1515/quageo-2015-0040		
A new companion for Mercator	2017	Cartography and Geographic Information Science	doi:10.1080/15230406.2017.1308837		

=== Book reviews ===
Title	Date	Journal/publication	Identifier	Citation(s)	Notes
Review of J. Bertin, “Semiologie Graphique”	1969	Journal of the American Statistical Association	doi:10.1080/01621459.1969.10500984		
Review of J. Forrester, "Urban Dynamics"	1970	Geographical analysis	doi:10.1111/j.1538-4632.1970.tb00157.x		
Review of J. Rayner, "An Introduction to Spectral Analysis"	1972	Geographical analysis	doi:10.1111/j.1538-4632.1973.tb01007.x		
Review of D. Maling, "Coordinate Systems and Map Projections"	1974	Surveying and Mapping			
Review of C. Brandenberger, "Koordinatentransformationen fuer Digitale Kartographische Daten mit Lagrange– und Spline–Interpolation."	1986	Surveying and Mapping			

=== Collaborations ===
Title	Co-authors(s)	Date	Journal/publication	Identifier	Citation(s)	Notes
The Multiple Use Concept in Cartography	J. Sherman	1957	The Professional Geographer	doi:10.1111/j.0033-0124.1957.095_5.x		
Geographical Ordering of Information: New Opportunities	Brian Berry and Richard Morrill	1964	The Professional Geographer	doi:10.1111/j.0033-0124.1964.039_q.x		
Geobotanical Distance Between New Zealand and Neighboring Islands	H. W. Mielke, T. R. Detwyler	1970	BioScience	doi:10.2307/1295012		
Uniform Distribution of Objects in a Homogeneous Field: Cities on a Plain	Leon Glass	1971	Nature	doi:10.1038/233067a0		
A Cappadocian Speculation	Sam Wineburg	1971	Nature	doi:10.1038/231039a0		
Spectral Analysis of Innovation Diffusion	B. Barton	1971	Geographical analysis	doi:10.1111/J.1538-4632.1971.TB00361.X		
Geographical Variances	H. Moellering	1972	Geographical analysis	doi:10.1111/j.1538-4632.1972.tb00455.x		
Isopleth Mapping using Histosplines	J. Lau	1978	Geographical analysis	doi:10.1111/j.1538-4632.1978.tb00656.x		
Interpolation of images via Histosplines	J. Lau	1979	Computer Graphics and Image Processing	doi:10.1016/0146-664X(79)90084-4		
Push–Pull Migration Laws	Guido Dorigo	1983	Annals of the Association of American Geographers	doi:10.1111/j.1467-8306.1983.tb01392.x		(Note: Push and pull factors in migration)
Geographical Interpolation	Susan Kennedy	1983	Geographical analysis	doi:10.1111/j.1538-4632.1983.tb00776.x		
The Globular Projection Generalized	M. Petrich	1984	The American Cartographer	doi:10.1559/152304084783914803		
Smooth Multidimensional Interpolation	Susan Kennedy	1985	Geographical analysis	doi:10.1111/j.1538-4632.1985.tb00846.x		
Computerized Quantitative Analysis of Kinetic Visual Fields	R. Weleber	1996	American Journal of Ophthalmology	doi:10.1016/0002-9394(86)90648-3		
A Quadtree for Global Information Storage	Zi-tan Chen	1986	Geographical analysis	doi:10.1111/j.1538-4632.1986.tb00108.x		
Exploring the Anchor Point Hypothesis of Spatial Cognition	H. Couclelis, R. Golledge, N. Gale,	1987	Journal of Environmental Psychology	doi:10.1016/S0272-4944(87)80020-8		
Three World Maps on a Moebius Strip	Mark P. Kumler	1991	Cartography and Geographic Information Science	doi:10.1559/152304091783786781		

== Books and translations ==
Title	Co-authors(s)	Date	Journal/publication	Identifier	Citation(s)	Notes
Notes and comments on the Composition of Terrestrial and Celestial Maps	Johann Heinrich Lambert	1972	Michigan Geographical Publication	ISBN 978-1589482814		(Note: Tobler's translated the work of Lambert into English and wrote the preface.)
Map Projection Transformation: Principles and Applications	Qihe Yang; John P. Snyder	2000	Taylor & Francis	ISBN 0-748-40667-0		
Are There Fundamental Principles in Geographic Information Science?	Nicholas R. Chrisman; Andrew Frank; Dan Sui; Michael Frank Goodchild	2012		ISBN 9781478213628		(Note: Tobler's contribution is the preference to the book.)

=== Book chapters, conference proceedings, and technical reports ===
Title	Editor(s)	Date	Publication	Identifier	Citation(s)	Notes
Electronic Mapping		1962	Conference Proceedings, Am Institute of Planners			
Spectral Analysis of Spatial Series		1966	Proceedings, Fourth Annual Conference on Urban Planning Information Systems			
Geometric Projections in System Studies	William Garrison; Duane Marble	1967	Quantitative Geography, II			
Transformations	J. Nystuen	1968	Michigan Inter-University Community of Mathematical Geographers Discussion Paper # 12			
Problems and Prospects in Geographical Photointerpretation	Cheng; Ledley; Pollock; Rosenfeld	1968	Proceedings, Symposium on Automatic Photointerpretation			
Data Display and Presentation	Roger Tomlinson	1972	Environment Information Systems			
Spatial Diffusion from a Geographer's Point of View	W. Benninghoff; R. Edwards	1972	U.S. International Biological Program Aerobiology Handbook No. 2			
Two Computer Districting Experiments	S. Pollock	1972	Algorithmic Approaches to Political Districting: Report of the Activities of a Seminar			
Cartograms and Cartosplines		1976	Proceedings: Workshop on Automated Cartography and Epidemiology, Washington, D.C., Department of Health, Education and Welfare			
Spatial Interaction: Extracting Meaning from Masses of Data	E. Swain	1976	The IIASA Project on Urban and Regional Systems			
The Geometry of Mental Maps	R. Golledge; G. Rushton	1977	Essays on the Multidimensional Analysis of Perceptions and Preferences			
Numerical Approaches to Map Projections	I. Kretschmer	1977	Studies in Theoretical Cartography	ISBN 3700544278		
Forecasting Geographical Migration		1977	Report of the Conference on Economic and Demographic Methods for Projecting Population			
Cellular Geography	S. Gale; G. Olsson	1979	Philosophy in Geography	ISBN 978-94-009-9394-5; doi:10.1007/978-94-009-9394-5_18		
Migration Fields	W. Clark; E. Moore	1978	Population Mobility and Residential Change	ISBN 9780810105232		
Statistical Cartography: What is it?		1980	Auto–Carto IV	link		
Surveying Multidimensional Measurement	R.G. Golledge; J.N.Rayner	1982	Proximity and Preference: Problems in the Multidimensional Analysis of Large Data Sets	ISBN 0816668655		
Cartographic Study of Movement Tables		1982	Proceedings, National Computer Graphics Association			
Measuring Spatial Resolution		1987	Proceedings, Land Resources Information Systems Conference			
Alternatives in Movement Mapping		1987	Proceedings, 13th International Cartographic Conference			
Resolution, Resampling, and All That	Helen Mounsey; Roger Tomlinson	1987	Building Data Bases for Global Science	ISBN 9780850664850		
The Quadratic Transportation Problem as a Model of Spatial Interaction Patterns	W. Foffey	1988	Essays in honor of William Warntz	ISBN 0771409737		
Prediction of Geographic Base File Size from Urban Area or Population	H. Veregin	1989	ICA Conference, Budapest			
Frame Independent Spatial Analysis	Michael Goodchild	1990	Accuracy of Spatial Data Bases	ISBN 9780429208317		
GIS Transformations		1990	Proceedings, National Computer Graphics Association Conference, Anaheim			
Preliminary Representation of World Population by Spherical Harmonics		1992	Proceedings, National Academy of Sciences	doi:10.1073/pnas.89.14.6262		
Three presentations on geographical analysis and modeling: Non-isotropic geographic modeling speculations on the geometry of geography global spatial analysis		1993	National center for geographic information and analysis	TECHNICAL REPORT 93-1		
Oblique Map Projections using Rotation Matrices	H. Ernste	1994	Pathways to Human Ecology	ISBN 978-3-906753-17-1		
The Global Demography Project	Uwe Deichmann, Jon Gottsegen, and Kelly Maloy	1995	National center for geographic information and analysis	Technical Report TR-95-6		
History of Cartography as taught at UCSB	F. Ormeling; Y. Bouma	1996	Seminar on Teaching of the History of Cartography			
Converting Administrative Data on a Sphere to a Continuous Surface		1996	Proceedings, 3rd International Conference on Integrating Geographic Information Systems and Environmental Modeling			
Demography in Global Change Studies		1997	Proceedings, AutoCarto 13	link		
Ma Vie	W. Pitts and P. Gould	2002	Geographical Voices	ISBN 9780815629405		(Note: Tobler's autobiography)

== Interview ==
Tobler was one of many geographers interviewed in the American Association of Geographers' Geographers on Film series.

- Pitts, Forrest Ralph (1992). "Geographers on Film Interview With Waldo Tobler".

== See also ==
- Cynthia Brewer – American geographer (born 1960)
- Concepts and Techniques in Modern Geography – Series of geography texts, 1975–1996
- Geographia Generalis – Geography textbook by Bernhardus Varenius
- Geographic information science – Scientific discipline
- George F. Jenks – American geographer and cartographer
- Mei-Po Kwan – Geographer
- Modifiable areal unit problem – Source of statistical bias
- Mark Monmonier bibliography – Geographer Mark Monmonier's publications
- Scientific Geography Series – Series of geography publications, 1985–1988
- Technical geography – Study of spatial information
- Tobler (name)
