= SNN =

SNN may refer to:

== Neural networks ==
- Semantic neural network, a natural language processing network based on those of John von Neumann and Nikolai Amosov
- Simulated neural network or static neural network, another term for an artificial neural network
- Spiking neural network, a type of artificial neural network
- Spatial neural network, another type of artificial neural network

== News and broadcasting ==
- ScrappleFace Network News, a faux newscast on ScrappleFace, an American conservative satirical website
- Student News Network, an Iranian news agency running in Tehran
- SNN News news-parody show on Swedish television
- SNN: Suncoast News Network, a 24/7 local news operation running in Sarasota, Florida
- SNN: Showbiz News Ngayon, a Philippine news show for showbiz
- Sports News Network (1989–1990), an American cable channel
- Sun News Network, a Canadian 24h news network
- Suncoast News Network, also known as WSNN-LD, an independent television station (channel 39) licensed to Sarasota, Florida, United States
- Sarimanok News Network, a Philippine 24/7 News Channel since 1996, now ABS-CBN News Channel or ANC since 1999

== Other ==
- Shannon Airport, Ireland (IATA code: SNN)
- Siona language of Colombia/Ecuador (ISO 639-3 code: snn)
- Smith & Nephew, a British manufacturer of medical equipment (NYSE ticker symbol: SNN)
- SNN (gene), a human gene encoding the protein stannin
- SN Nuclearelectrica, a Romanian nuclear energy company
