= Distributed GIS =

Type of geographic information system

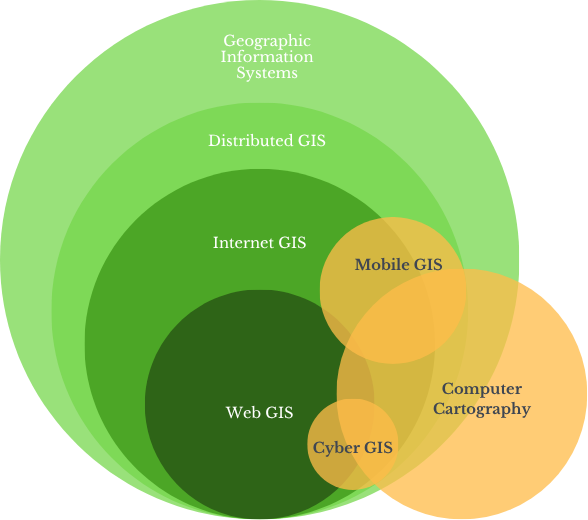
Relationship between general GIS, distributed GIS, Internet GIS, Web GIS, Mobile GIS, Cyber GIS, and computer cartography.

Distributed GIS refers to GI Systems that do not have all of the system components in the same physical location. This could be the processing, the database, the rendering or the user interface. It represents a special case of distributed computing, with examples of distributed systems including Internet GIS, Web GIS, and Mobile GIS. Distribution of resources provides corporate and enterprise-based models for GIS (involving multiple databases, different computers undertaking spatial analysis and a diverse ecosystem of often spatially-enabled client devices). Distributed GIS permits a shared services model, including data fusion (or mashups) based on Open Geospatial Consortium (OGC) web services. Distributed GIS technology enables modern online mapping systems (such as Google Maps and Bing Maps), Location-based services (LBS), web-based GIS (such as ArcGIS Online) and numerous map-enabled applications. Other applications include transportation, logistics, utilities, farm / agricultural information systems, real-time environmental information systems and the analysis of the movement of people. In terms of data, the concept has been extended to include volunteered geographical information. Distributed processing allows improvements to the performance of spatial analysis through the use of techniques such as parallel processing.

== Etymology ==
The term Distributed GIS was coined by Bruce Gittings at the University of Edinburgh. He was responsible for one of the first Internet-based distributed GIS. In 1994, he designed and implemented the World Wide Earthquake Locator, which provided maps of recent earthquake occurrences to a location-independent user, which used the Xerox PARC Map Viewer (based in California, USA), managed by an interface based in Edinburgh (Scotland), which drew data in real-time from the National Earthquake Information Center (USGS) in Colorado, USA. Gittings first taught a course in Distributed GIS in 2005 as part of the Masters Programme in GIS at that institution .

== Types ==
=== Parallel computing in GIS ===
Parallel processing is the use of multiple CPU’s to execute different sections of a program together. The terms "concurrent computing," "parallel computing," and "distributed computing" do not have a clear distinction between them. Parallel computing today involves the utilization of a single computer with multi-core processors or multiple computers that are connected over a network working on the same task. In the case of Distributed GIS, parallel computing using multi-core processors on the same machine would be where the line starts to blur between traditional desktop GIS and distributed. When done in different locations, it is much clearer. As parallel computing has become the dominant paradigm in computer architecture, mainly in the form of multi-core processors, this is important to mention.

Today, there are many examples of applying parallel computing to GIS. For example, remote sensing and surveying equipment have been providing vast amounts of spatial information, and how to manage, process or dispose of this data have become major issues in the field of Geographic Information Science (GIS). To solve these problems there has been much research into the area of parallel processing of GIS information. This involves the utilization of a single computer with multiple processors or multiple computers that are connected over a network working on the same task, or series of tasks. The hadoop framework has been used successfully in GIS processing.

=== Organization GIS ===
==== Enterprise GIS ====
Enterprise GIS refers to a geographical information system that integrates geographic data across multiple departments and serves the whole organisation. The basic idea of an enterprise GIS is to deal with departmental needs collectively instead of individually. When organisations started using GIS in the 1960s and 1970s, the focus was on individual projects where individual users created and maintained data sets on their own desktop computers. Due to extensive interaction and work-flow between departments, many organisations have in recent years switched from independent, stand-alone GIS systems to more integrated approaches that share resources and applications.

Some of the potential benefits that an enterprise GIS can provide include significantly reduced redundancy of data across the system, improved accuracy and integrity of geographic information, and more efficient use and sharing of data. Since data is one of the most significant investments in any GIS program, any approach that reduces acquisition costs while maintaining data quality is important. The implementation of an enterprise GIS may also reduce the overall GIS maintenance and support costs providing a more effective use of departmental GIS resources. Data can be integrated and used in decision-making processes across the whole organisation.

==== Corporate GIS ====
A corporate Geographical Information System, is similar to Enterprise GIS and satisfies the spatial information needs of an organisation as a whole in an integrated manner. Corporate GIS consists of four technological elements which are data, standards, information technology and personnel with expertise. It is a coordinated approach that moves away from fragmented desktop GIS. The design of a corporate GIS includes the construction of a centralised corporate database that is designed to be the principle resource for an entire organisation. The corporate database is specifically designed to efficiently and effectively suit the requirements of the organisation. Essential to a corporate GIS is the effective management of the corporate database and the establishment of standards such as OGC for mapping and database technologies.

Benefits include that all the users in the organisation have access to shared, complete, accurate, high quality and up-to-date data. All the users in the organisation also have access to shared technology and people with expertise. This improves the efficiency and effectiveness of the organisation as a whole. A successfully managed corporate database reduces redundant collection and storage of information across the organisation. By centralising resources and efforts, it reduces the overall cost.

=== Internet GIS ===
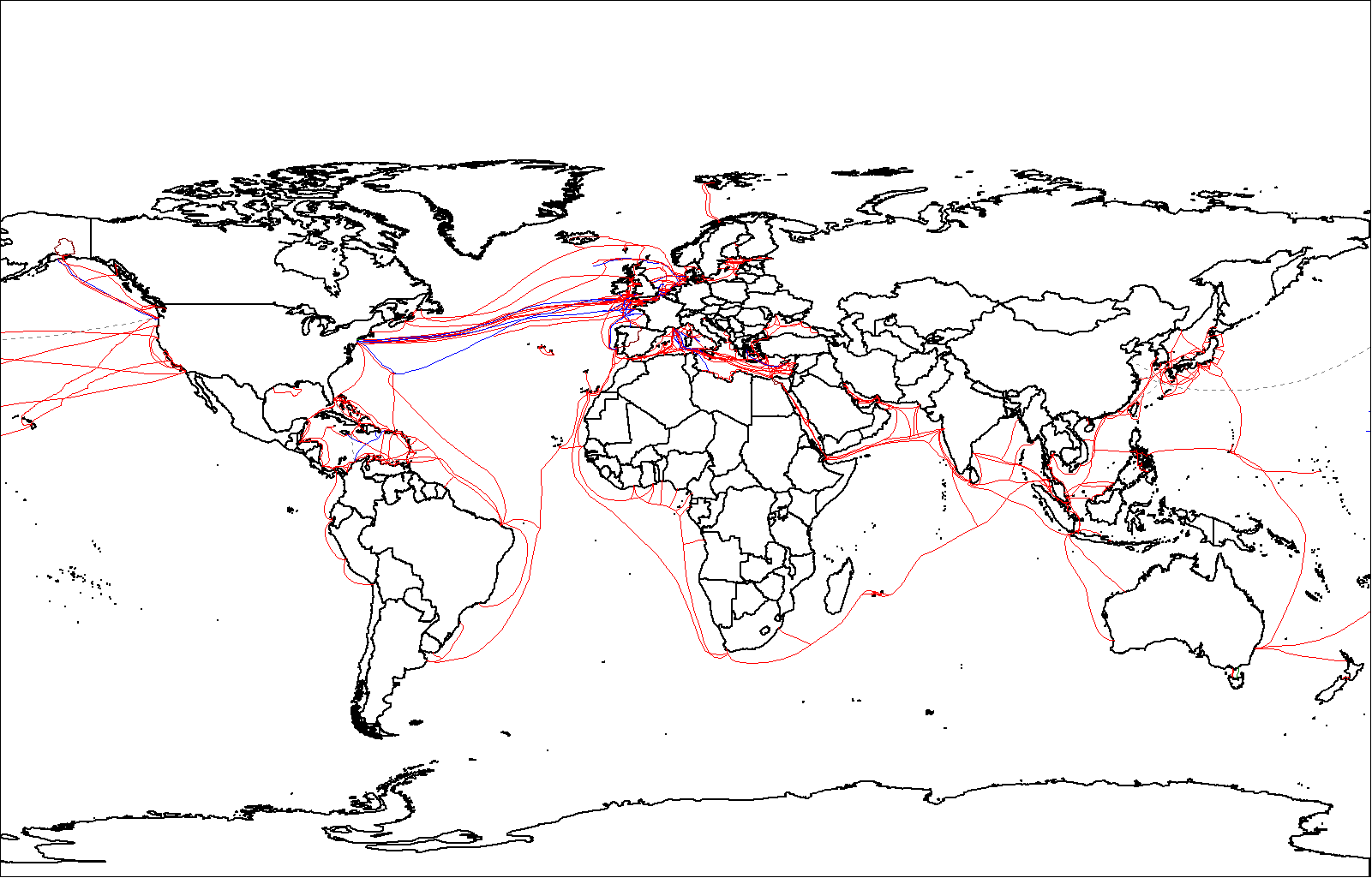
2007 map showing submarine fiberoptic telecommunication cables around the world.

Internet GIS is broad set of technologies and applications that employ the Internet to access, analyze, visualize, and distribute spatial data via geographic information systems (GIS). Internet GIS is an outgrowth of traditional GIS, and represents a shift from conducting GIS on an individual computer to working with remotely distributed data and functions. Two major issues in GIS are accessing and distributing spatial data and GIS outputs. Internet GIS helps to solve that problem by allowing users to access vast databases impossible to store on a single desktop computer, and by allowing rapid dissemination of both maps and raw data to others. These methods include both file sharing and email. This has enabled the general public to participate in map creation and make use of GIS technology.

VPN connectivity overview, showing intranet site-to-site and remote-work configurations used together

==== Web GIS ====
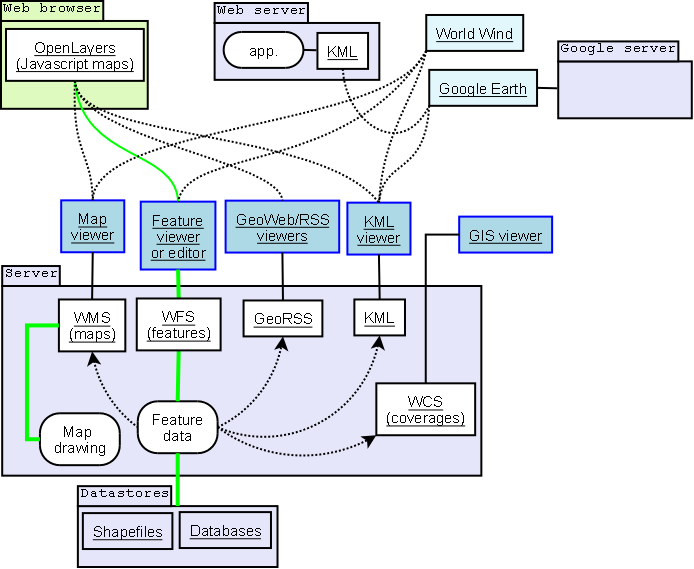
OGC standards help GIS tools communicate.

Web GIS, also known as Web-based GIS, are Geographic Information Systems (GIS) that employ the World Wide Web (the Web) to facilitate the storage, visualization, analysis, and distribution of spatial information over the Internet. Web GIS involves using the Web to facilitate GIS tasks traditionally done on a desktop computer, as well as enabling the sharing of maps and spatial data.

=== Mobile GIS ===
Number of mobile cellular subscriptions 2012–2016

Cell phones and other wireless communication forms have become common in society. Many of these devices are connected to the internet and can access internet GIS applications like any other computer. These devices are networked together, using technology such as the mobile web. Unlike traditional computers, however, these devices generate immense amounts of spatial data available to the device user and many governments and private entities. The tools, applications, and hardware used to facilitate GIS through the use of wireless technology is mobile GIS. Used by the holder of the device, mobile GIS enables navigation applications like Google Maps to help the user navigate to a location. When used by private firms, the location data collected can help businesses understand foot traffic in an area to optimize business practices. Governments can use this data to monitor citizens. Access to locational data by third parties has led to privacy concerns.

With ~80% of all data deemed to have a spatial component, modern Mobile GIS is an important tool. The number of mobile devices in circulation has surpassed the world's population with a rapid acceleration in iOS and Android, as tablets are also proving to be efficient at field work.

Although not all applications of mobile GIS are limited by the device, many are. These limitations are more applicable to smaller devices such as cell phones and PDAs. Such devices have small screens with poor resolution, limited memory and processing power, a poor (or no) keyboard, and short battery life. Additional limitations can be found in web client-based tablet applications: poor web GUI and device integration, online reliance, and very limited offline web client cache.

Mobile GIS has a significant overlap with internet GIS; however, not all mobile GIS employs the internet, much less the mobile web. Thus, the categories are distinct.

=== CyberGIS ===
CyberGIS, or cyber geographic information science and systems, is a term used to describe the use of cyberinfrastructure, to perform GIS tasks with storage and processing resources of multiple institutions through, usually through the World Wide Web. CyberGIS focuses on computational and data-intensive geospatial problem-solving within various research and education domains by leveraging the power of distributed computation. CyberGIS has been described as "GIS detached from the desktop and deployed on the web, with the associated issues of hardware, software, data storage, digital networks, people, training and education." The term CyberGIS first entered the literature in 2010, pioneered by researchers including Shaowen Wang at the University of Illinois Urbana-Champaign, and is predominantly used by the University of Illinois at Urbana-Champaign and collaborators to describe their software and research developed to use big data and high-performance computing approaches to collaborative problem-solving.

==== CyberGIS Supercomputer ====
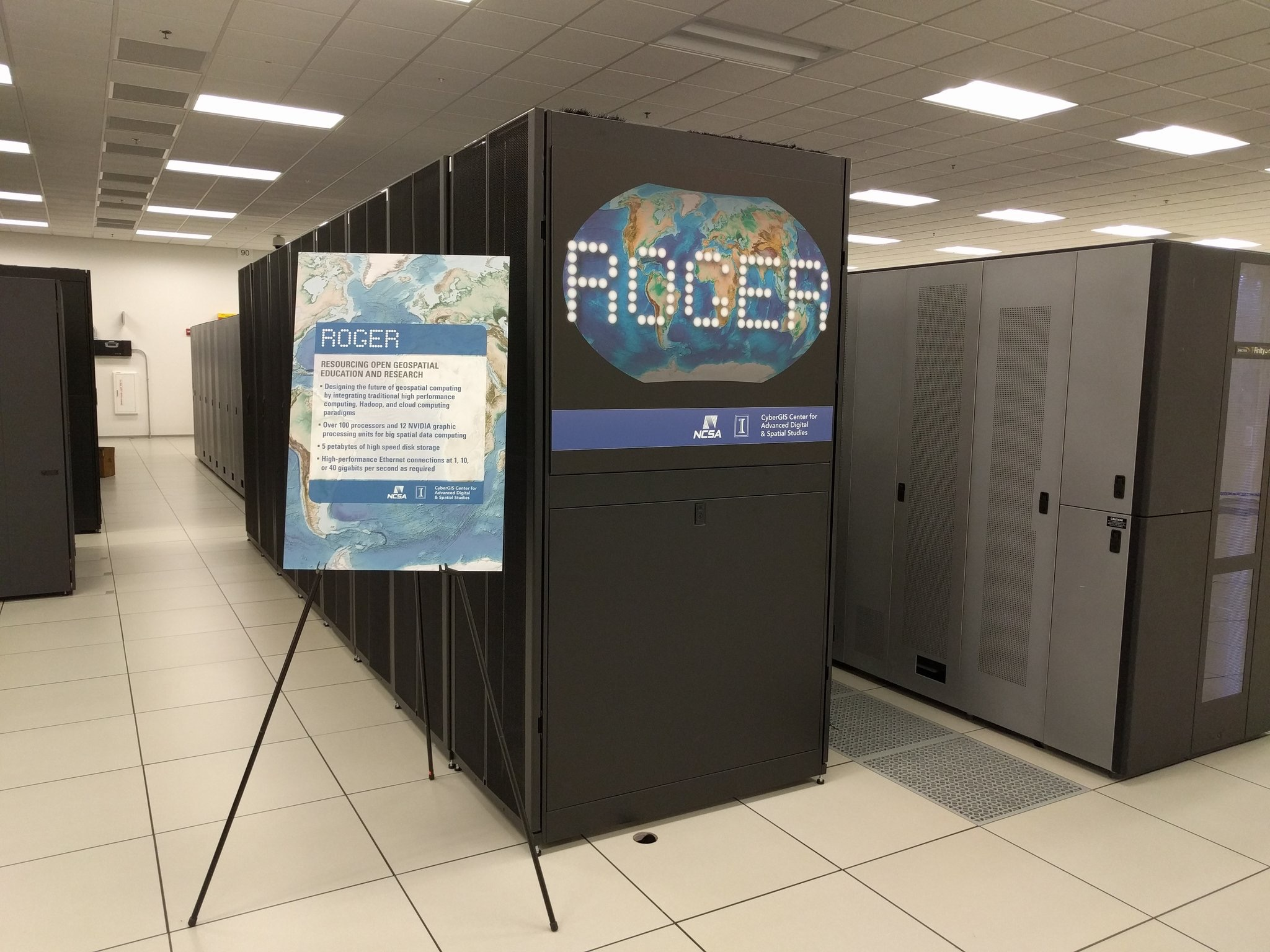
The CyberGIS Center for Advanced Digital and Spatial Studies at the University of Illinois at Urbana-Champaign ROGER cyberGIS supercomputer. ROGER is hosted by the National Center for Supercomputing Applications.

In 2014, the CyberGIS Center for Advanced Digital and Spatial Studies at the University of Illinois at Urbana-Champaign received a National Science Foundation major research instrumentation grant to establish ROGER as the first cyberGIS supercomputer. ROGER, hosted by the National Center for Supercomputing Applications, is optimized to deal with geospatial data and computation and is equipped with:

- approximately six petabytes of raw disk storage with high input/output bandwidth;
- solid-state drives for applications demanding high data-access performance;
- advanced graphics processing units for exploiting massive parallelism in geospatial computing;
- interactive visualization supported with a high-speed network and dynamically provisioned cloud computing resources.

CyberGIS software and tools integrate these system components to support a large number of users who are investigating scientific problems in areas spanning biosciences, engineering, geosciences, and social sciences.

== Applications ==
=== Location-Based Services ===
Location-based services (LBS) are services that are distributed wirelessly and provide information relevant to the user's current location. These services include such things as ‘find my nearest …’, directions, and various vehicle monitoring systems, such as the GM OnStar system amongst others. Location-based services are generally run on mobile phones and PDAs, and are intended for use by the general public more than Mobile GIS systems which are geared towards commercial enterprise. Devices can be located by triangulation using the mobile phone network and/or GPS.

=== Web Mapping Services ===
A web mapping service is a means of displaying and interacting with maps on the Web. The first web mapping service was the Xerox PARC Map Viewer built in 1993 and decommissioned in 2000.

There have been 3 generations of web map service. The first generation was from 1993 onwards and consisted of simple image maps which had a single click function. The second generation was from 1996 onwards and still used image maps the one click function. However, they also had zoom and pan capabilities (although slow) and could be customised through the use of the URL API. The third generation was from 1998 onwards and were the first to include slippy maps. They utilise AJAX technology which enables seamless panning and zooming. They are customisable using the URL API and can have extended functionality programmed in using the DOM.

Web map services are based on the concept of the image map whereby this defines the area overlaying an image (e.g. GIF). An image map can be processed client or server side. As functionality is built into the web server, performance is good. Image maps can be dynamic. When image maps are used for geographic purposes, the co-ordinate system must be transformed to the geographical origin to conform to the geographical standard of having the origin at the bottom left corner. Web maps are used for location-based services.

=== Local search ===
Local search is a recent approach to internet searching that incorporates geographical information into search queries so that the links that you return are more relevant to where you are. It developed out of an increasing awareness that many search engine users are using it to look for a business or service in the local area. Local search has stimulated the development of web mapping, which is used either as a tool to use in geographically restricting your search (see Live Search Maps) or as an additional resource to be returned along with search result listings (see Google Maps). It has also led to an increase in the number of small businesses advertising on the web.

=== Mashups ===
In distributed GIS, the term mashup refers to a generic web service which combines content and functionality from disparate sources; mashups reflect a separation of information and presentation. Mashups are increasingly being used in commercial and government applications as well as in the public domain. When used in GIS, it reflects the concept of connecting an application with a mapping service. An examples is combining Google maps with Chicago crime statistics to create the Chicago crime statistics map. Mashups are fast, provide value for money and remove responsibility for the data from the creator.

Second-generation systems provide mashups mainly based on URL parameters, while Third generation systems (e.g. Google Maps) allow customization via script (e.g. JavaScript).

== Standards ==
=== Open Geospatial Consortium ===
The main standards for Distributed GIS are provided by the Open Geospatial Consortium (OGC). OGC is a non-profit international group that seeks to Web-Enable GIS and, in turn Geo-Enable the web. One of the major issues concerning distributed GIS is the interoperability of the data since it can come in different formats using different projection systems. OGC standards seek to provide interoperability between data and to integrate existing data.

=== Global System for Mobile Communications ===
Global System for Mobile Communications (GSM) is a global standard for mobile phones around the world. Networks using the GSM system offer transmission of voice, data, and messages in text and multimedia form and provide web, telenet, FTP, email services, etc., over the mobile network. Almost two million people are now using GSM. Five main standards of GSM exist: GSM 400, GSM 850, GSM 900, GSM-1800 (DCS), and GSM1900 (PCS). GSM 850 and GSM 1900 are used in North America, parts of Latin America, and parts of Africa. In Europe, Asia, and Australia GSM 900/1800 standard is used.

GSM consists of two components: the mobile radio telephone and Subscriber Identity Module. GSM is a cellular network, which is a radio network made up of a number of cells. For each cell, the transmitter (known as a base station) is transmitting and receiving signals. The base station is controlled through the Base Station Controller via the Mobile Switching Centre.

For GSM enhancement General Packet Radio Service (GPRS), a packet-oriented data service for data transmission, and Universal Mobile Telecommunications System (UTMS), the Third Generation (3G) mobile communication system, technology was introduced. Both provide similar services to 2G, but with greater bandwidth and speed.

=== Wireless Application Protocol ===
Wireless Application Protocol (WAP) is a standard for the data transmission of internet content and services. It is a secure specification that allows users to access information instantly via mobile phones, pagers, two-way radios, smartphones, and communicators. WAP supports HTML and XML, and WML language, and is specifically designed for small screens and one-hand navigation without a keyboard. WML is scalable from two-line text displays up to the graphical screens found on smartphones. It is much stricter than HTML and is similar to JavaScript.

== See also ==
- AM/FM/GIS
- ArcGIS
- Automotive navigation system
- Cadastral map
- Collaborative mapping
- Comparison of GIS software
- Concepts and Techniques in Modern Geography
- Counter-mapping
- Digital geological mapping
- Geographic information systems in geospatial intelligence
- Geodatabase (Esri)
- Geomatics
- GIS and aquatic science
- GIS and public health
- GISCorps
- GIS Day
- GIS in archaeology
- GvSIG
- Historical GIS
- Internet GIS
- List of GIS data sources
- List of GIS software
- Map database management
- Participatory GIS
- QGIS
- SAGA GIS
- Spatial Data Infrastructure (SDI)
- Technical geography
- TerrSet
- Tobler's first law of geography
- Tobler's second law of geography
- Traditional knowledge GIS
- Virtual globe
