= Visioncivil =

VisionCivil is a solution of calculations and designs that helps engineers and land surveyors of Canada. Programmers have developed the civil engineering software in order to facilitate terrain modeling from different angles; triangulation mode, producing profiles, sections cross plans, capping, pipe services, and also to make rapid and accurate volume calculations for land surveyors and civil engineers.

Initially released in late 1992 VisionCivil was one of the first vertical computer-aided design programs. VisionCivil ran on primitive entities, as the technology evolved VisionCivil followed. In 1996, from a simple design tool it acquired graphic interface and C programming. The drafting features associated with COGO calculations and digital terrain modeling capacities brought VisionCivil to the new era.

VisionCivil, developed by Geo-Plus, is a pioneer for Canada’s geomatics industry and is widely use for it has thousands of licenses in circulation.

VisionCivil runs on AutoCAD, MicroStation, PowerDraft and BricsCAD environments.

== Education ==
VisionCivil and VisionPlus are used in some technical design colleges in the world as a teaching tool for geomatics.

== Version history ==
Official name	Version	Release	Date of Release
Version 1	1.0	1	1991,dec
Version 2	2.0	2	1992, dec
Version 3	3.0	3	1993, dec
Version 4	4.0	4	1994,dec
Version 5	5.0	5	1995, dec
Version 6	6.0	6	1996, dec
Version 7	7.0	7	1997, dec
Version 8	8.0	8	1998,dec
Version 9	9.1	9	1999, dec
Version 10	10.0	10	2000, dec
Version 11	11.1	11	2001, dec
Version 12	12.2	12	2002, dec
Version 14	14.0	14	2003, dec
Version 15	15.1	15	2004, dec
Version 16	16.1	16	2005, dec
VisionCivil2007	17.0	17	2006, dec
VisionCivil2008	18.0	18	2008, jan
VisionCivil2009	19.1	19	2008, dec
VisionCivil2010	20.1	20	2010, jan
VisionCivil2011	21.4	21	2011, mar
VisionCivil2012	22.2	22	2012, mar
VisionCivil2013	23.4	23	2013, mar
VisionCivil2014	24.46	24	2014, apr
VisionCivil2015	25.2	25	2015, jan
VisionCivil Pro 2016	26.0	26	2016, apr
VisionCivil Pro 2017	27.0	27	2017, apr
VisionCivil Pro 2018	28.0	28	2018, apr
VisionCivil Pro 2019	29.0	29	2019, apr
VisionCivil Pro 2020	30.0	30	2020, apr
VisionCivil Pro 2021	31.0	31	2021, apr
VisionCivil Pro 2022	32.0	32	2022, apr
VisionCivil Pro 2023	33.0	33	2023, apr
VisionCivil Pro 2024	34.0	34	2024, apr
