= Web GIS =

Technologies employing the World Wide Web to manage spatial data

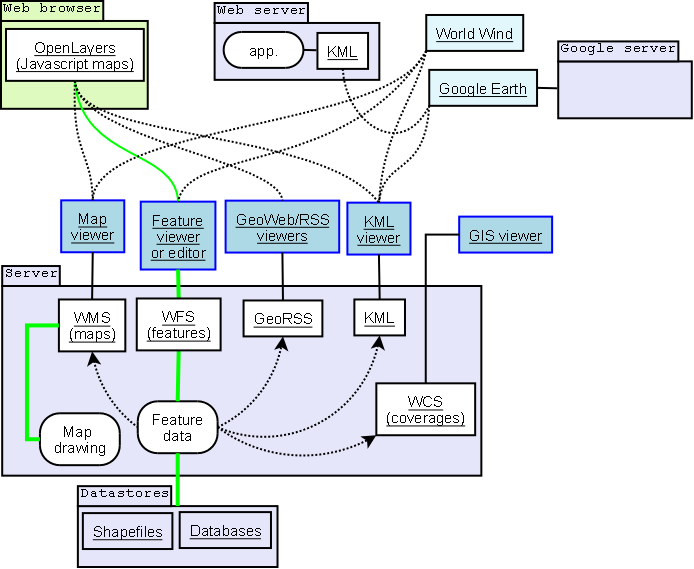
OGC standards help GIS tools communicate.

Web GIS, also known as Web-based GIS, are Geographic Information Systems (GIS) that employ the World Wide Web (the Web) to facilitate the storage, visualization, analysis, and distribution of spatial information over the Internet. Web GIS involves using the Web to facilitate GIS tasks traditionally done on a desktop computer, as well as enabling the sharing of maps and spatial data.

Web GIS is a subset of Internet GIS, which is itself a subset of distributed GIS. The most common application of Web GIS is Web mapping, so much so that the two terms are often used interchangeably in much the same way as between digital mapping and GIS. However, Web GIS and web mapping are distinct concepts, with web mapping not necessarily requiring a Web GIS.

The use of the Web has dramatically increased the effectiveness of both accessing and distributing spatial data, two of the most significant challenges of desktop GIS. Many functions, such as interactivity, and dynamic scaling, are made widely available to end users by web services. The scale of the Web can sometimes make finding quality and reliable data a challenge for GIS professionals and end users, with a significant amount of low-quality, poorly organized, or poorly sourced material available for public consumption. This can make finding spatial data a time consuming activity for GIS users.

== History ==
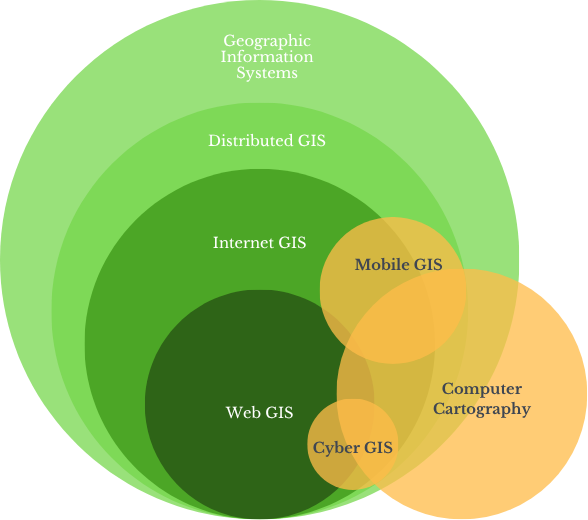
Relationship between general GIS, distributed GIS, Internet GIS, Web GIS, Mobile GIS, Cyber GIS, and computer cartography.

The history of Web GIS is very closely tied to the history of geographic information systems, Digital mapping, and the World Wide Web or the Web. The Web was first created in 1990, and the first major web mapping program capable of distributed map creation appeared shortly after in 1993. This software, named PARC Map Viewer, was unique in that it facilitated dynamic user map generation, rather than static images. This software also allowed users to employ GIS without having it locally installed on their machine. The US federal government made the TIGER Mapping Service available to the public in 1995, which facilitated desktop and Web GIS by hosting US boundary data. In 1996, MapQuest became available to the public, facilitating navigation and trip planning, which quickly became a major utility on the early Web.

In 1997, Esri began to focus on their desktop GIS software, which in 2000 became ArcGIS. This led to Esri dominating the GIS industry for the next several years. In 2000 Esri launched the Geography Network, which offered some web GIS functions. In 2014, ArcGIS Online replaced this, and offers significant Web GIS functions including hosting, manipulating, and visualizing data in dynamic applications.

== Applications ==
Web GIS has numerous applications and functions and manages most distributed spatial information. Diverse industries and disciplines, including mathematics, history, business and education can all leverage Web GIS to integrate geographic approaches to data.

=== Digital Twins and Smart Cities ===
Web GIS plays a key role in the development and operation of digital twins and smart city platforms by providing web-based access to spatial data, real-time information, and interactive visualizations. Digital twins integrate geographic information with data from sensors, infrastructure systems, and Internet of Things (IoT) devices to create dynamic virtual representations of cities, urban assets and industrial or commercial facilities. These digital twin platforms support urban planning, asset management, environmental monitoring, and mobility analysis by enabling stakeholders to visualize and analyze changes in the built environment. In smart cities, Web GIS applications are also used to improve public services, enhance situational awareness, and support data-driven, AI supported decision-making through interactive mapping and location-based analytics.

=== Citizen Information ===
Web GIS applications are widely used by municipalities to provide citizens with access to online city maps, public infrastructure information, planning projects, and other location-based services. Interactive mapping platforms help residents explore urban development initiatives.

=== Census demographic data ===
The United States Census Department extensively uses Web GIS to distribute its boundary data, such as TIGER files, and demographics to the public. The "2020 Census Demographic Data Map Viewer" runs on an ESRI Web Map Application, and provides demographic information, such as population, race, and housing information at the state, county, and census tract levels.

=== Education ===
Literature has identified educational benefits and applications of Web GIS at the elementary, primary, and university levels of education. Using story maps and dashboards allows for new ways of displaying spatial data, and facilitates student interaction. As Web GIS tools are often user friendly, teachers can create their own visualizations for the classroom, or even have students make their own to teach geographic concepts.

=== Public health ===
Web GIS has been used extensively in public health to communicate health data to the public and policymakers. During the COVID-19 Pandemic, dashboard Web GIS Apps were popularized as a template for displaying health data by Johns Hopkins University, which was updated until 10 March 2023. In the United States, all 50 state governments, the CDC, and others ultimately made use of these tools. These dashboards displayed various information but generally included a choropleth map showing COVID-19 case data.

=== Public Participation ===
Web GIS applications are also used in public participation and community engagement initiatives, allowing citizens to contribute feedback and local knowledge through map-based platforms and surveys. Such approaches are often described as Public Participation GIS (PPGIS).

== Web Services ==
Web GIS has numerous functions, which can be divided into categories of Geospatial web services, including web feature services, web processing services, and web mapping services. Geospatial web services are distinct software packages available on the World Wide Web that can be employed to perform a function with spatial data.

=== Web feature services ===
Dynamic web page: example of server-side scripting (PHP and MySQL)

Web feature services allow users to access, edit, and make use of hosted geospatial feature datasets.

=== Web processing services ===
Web processing services allow users to perform GIS calculations on spatial data. Web processing services standardize inputs, and outputs, for spatial data within an internet GIS and may have standardized algorithms for spatial statistics.

=== Web mapping services ===
Web mapping involves using distributed tools to create and host both static and dynamic maps. It is different than desktop digital mapping in that the data, software, or both might not be stored locally and are often distributed across many computers. Web mapping allows for the rapid distribution of spatial visualizations without the need for printing. They also facilitates rapid updating to reflect new datasets and allow for interactive datasets that would be impossible in print media. Web mapping was employed extensively during the COVID-19 pandemic to visualize the datasets in close to real-time.

=== Web coverage services ===
The Open Geospatial Consortium (OGC) Web Coverage Service (WCS) Interface Standard defines a web-based interface for the retrieval of coverages—that is, digital geospatial information representing space/time-varying phenomena. By providing direct access to underlying geospatial data rather than just static map images, WCS enables more advanced analysis, modeling, and processing of GIS data.

=== Web Map Tile Service ===
A Web Map Tile Service (WMTS) is a standard protocol for serving pre-rendered or run-time computed georeferenced map tiles over the Internet. The specification was developed and first published by the Open Geospatial Consortium in 2010.

== Standards ==
=== Open Geospatial Consortium ===
In terms of interoperability, the use of communication standards in Distributed GIS is particularly important. General standards for Geospatial Data have been developed by the Open Geospatial Consortium (OGC). For the exchange of Geospatial Data over the web, the most important OGC standards are Web Map Service (WMS) and Web Feature Service (WFS).

Using OGC-compliant gateways allows for building very flexible Distributed GI Systems. Unlike monolithic GI Systems, OGC compliant systems are naturally web-based and do not have strict definitions of servers and clients. For instance, if a user (client) accesses a server, that server itself can act as a client of a number of further servers in order to retrieve data requested by the user. This concept allows for data retrieval from any number of different sources, providing consistent data standards are used. This concept allows data transfer with systems not capable of GIS functionality. A key function of OGC standards is the integration of different systems already existing and thus geo-enabling the web. Web services providing different functionality can be used simultaneously to combine data from different sources (mash-ups). Thus, different services on distributed servers can be combined for ‘service-chaining’ in order to add additional value to existing services. Providing a wide use of OGC standards by different web services, sharing distributed data of multiple organizations becomes possible.

Some important languages used in OGC-compliant systems are described in the following. XML stands for eXtensible Markup language and is widely used for displaying and interpreting data from computers. Thus the development of a web-based GI system requires several useful XML encodings that can effectively describe two-dimensional graphics such as maps SVG and, at the same time, store and transfer simple features GML. Because GML and SVG are both XML encodings, it is very straightforward to convert between the two using an XML Style Language Transformation XSLT. This gives an application a means of rendering GML, and in fact, is the primary way that it has been accomplished among existing applications today. XML can introduce innovative web services, in terms of GIS. It allows geographic information to be easily translated in graphics and in these terms, scalar vector graphics (SVG) can produce high-quality dynamic outputs by using data retrieved from spatial databases. In the same aspect, Google, one of the pioneers in web-based GIS, has developed its own language, which also uses an XML structure. Keyhole Markup Language (KML) is a file format used to display geographic data in an earth browser, such as Google Earth, Google Maps, and Google Maps for mobile browsers "Google KML definition".

=== Geospatial Semantic Web ===
The Geospatial Semantic Web is a vision to include geospatial information at the core of the Semantic Web to facilitate information retrieval and information integration. This vision requires the definition of geospatial ontologies, semantic gazetteers, and shared technical vocabularies to describe geographic phenomena. The Semantic Geospatial Web is part of geographic information science.

== Criticism ==
All maps are simplifications of reality and, therefore, can never be perfectly accurate. These inaccuracies include distortions introduced during projection, simplifications, and human error. While traditionally trained ethical cartographers try to minimize these errors and document the known sources of error, including where the data originated, Web GIS facilitates the creation of maps by non-traditionally trained cartographers and, more significantly, facilitates the rapid dissemination of their potentially erroneous maps. While this democratization of GIS has many potential positives, including empowering traditionally disenfranchised groups of people, it also means that a wide audience can see bad maps. Further, malicious actors can quickly spread intentionally misleading spatial information while hiding the source. This has significant implications, and contributes to the infodemic surrounding many topics, including the spread of potentially misleading information on the COVID-19 pandemic. Even a map made by a skilled cartographer has significant limitations over traditional distribution methods when using the Web. Among a variety of issues, computer monitors have a variety of different color settings and sizes. This renders ratio, representative fraction, and verbal scales useless, leaving only the scale bar. It also means a color choice selected by the cartographer might not be what the end-user experiences. These issues are not limited to cartography but are difficult to solve.

Due to the nature of the Web, using it for storing and computation is less secure than using local networks. When working with sensitive data, Web GIS may expose an organization to the additional risk of having its data breached then if they use dedicated hardware and a virtual private network (VPN) to access that hardware remotely over the internet. The convenience and relatively low cost of Web GIS often prevents this from being implemented.

As Web GIS is built on the web, it is subject to link rot phenomena. This phenomenon can lead to previously available data being lost due to users changing the URL, physical hardware failures, or the content being deleted by the publisher. If the hardware and information accessed within a Web GIS is lost, "a single disk failure could be like the burning of the library at Alexandria." One study found that 23% of COVID-19 Dashboards available on government sites on February 2021 were no longer available at the previous URLs by April 2023.

== See also ==
- AM/FM/GIS
- Automotive navigation system
- Comparison of GIS software
- Geodatabase (Esri)
- GIS Day
- List of GIS data sources
- List of GIS software
- Map database management
- Participatory GIS
- Spatial neural network
- Traditional knowledge GIS
