= Stannin =

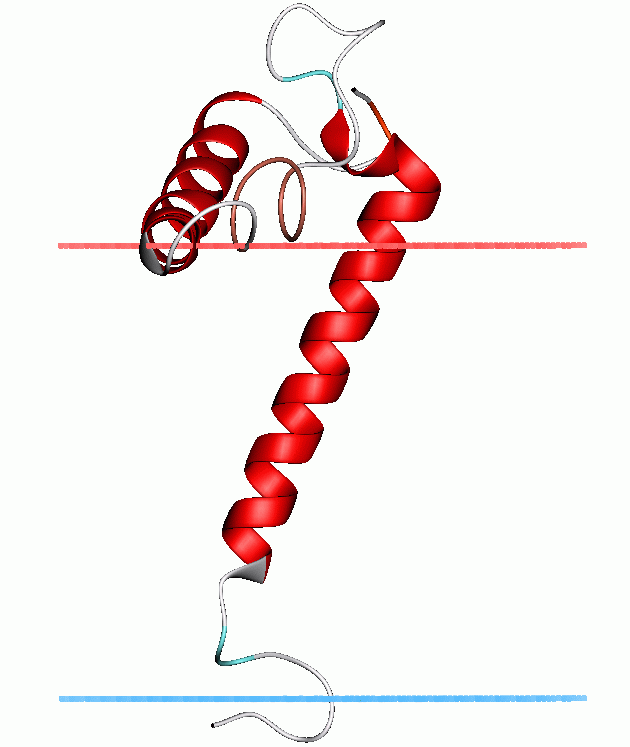
- Stannin

Identifiers
- Symbol: SNN_transmemb
- Pfam: PF09049
- InterPro: IPR015135
- OPM superfamily: 47
- OPM protein: 1zza
- Membranome: 104
Available protein structures:
- PDB: IPR015135 PF09049 (ECOD; PDBsum)
- AlphaFold: IPR015135; PF09049

Stannins are small proteins that consist of a single transmembrane helix, an unstructured linker domain, and a cytoplasmic domain. The transmembrane region contains a conserved cysteine residue (Cys32) that, together with Cys34 found in the stannin unstructured linker domain, constitutes the putative trimethyltin-binding site, close to the lipid/solvent interface.

The unstructured protein region connects two adjacent helical domains. It contains a conserved CXC metal-binding motif and a putative 14-3-3-zeta binding domain. Upon coordinating dimethytin, considerable structural or dynamic changes in the flexible loop region of SNN may take place, recruiting other binding partners such as 14-3-3-zeta, and thereby initiating the apoptotic cascade.

The cytoplasmic domain forms a distorted helix that is partially absorbed into the plane of the lipid bilayer. It interacts with the surface of the lipid bilayer, and contributes to the initiation of the apoptotic cascade on binding of the unstructured linker domain to dimethyltin.

== Human proteins containing this domain ==
SNN;
