= World Database on Protected and Conserved Areas =

Data base which repertories and classifies international protected areas

- Producer: Protected Planet Initiative, UNEP-WCMC (Cambridge, United Kingdom)
- History: 1981-present

Coverage
- Geospatial coverage: Global
- Update frequency: Monthly

Links
- Website: https://www.protectedplanet.net/en

The World Database on Protected and Conserved Areas (WDPCA) is the most comprehensive global database of marine, terrestrial and inland water protected areas and other effective area-based conservation measures (OECMs). As of May 2026, the WDPCA contains data on more than 312,000 protected areas and approximately 7,400 OECMs across 25 countries and territories. It is a joint product between the UN Environment Programme (UNEP) and the International Union for Conservation of Nature (IUCN), managed by the UN Environment Programme World Conservation Monitoring Centre (UNEP-WCMC).

The WDPCA plays an important role in tracking progress towards global conservation goals and targets. Notably, the Headline Indicator for Target 3 of the Kunming-Montreal Global Biodiversity Framework is derived from the WDPCA, alongside related biodiversity datasets, as are indicators for the UN Sustainable Development Goals 14 (Life Below Water) and 15 (Life on Land). The WDPCA also provides several core indicators of the Intergovernmental Science-Policy Platform on Biodiversity and Ecosystem Services (IPBES), and other international assessments and reports, including the Global Biodiversity Outlook.

The WDPCA exists due to the extensive efforts of national governments and other stakeholders to map, monitor and report data on protected areas and OECMs. Data is primarily reported by governments agencies, in addition to regional entities and secretariats of intergovernmental agreements and processes. Indigenous Peoples, local communities and other stakeholders can also provide data on protected areas and OECMs under their governance. The data is made available online through the Protected Planet website where it is both viewable and downloadable. Protected Planet Reports, published every two to three years, draw on the WDPCA to provide an in-depth analysis of the status of protected and conserved areas globally. The Protected Planet Initiative encompasses the WDPCA, the Global Database on Protected Area Management Effectiveness (GD-PAME), and associated data and information.

== History ==
The WDPCA was launched in November 2025, bringing together and rebranding two flagship Protected Planet databases: the World Database on Protected Areas (WDPA) and World Database on Other Effective Area-Based Conservation Measures (WD-OECM). Prior to the formation of the WDPCA, the WDPA and WD-OECM operated as separate databases.

The WDPA was established as a spatial database in 1981, but the mandate and history of the database dates back to 1959 when the United Nations (UN) Economic and Social Council called for a list of national parks and equivalent reserves in recognition that they 'are valuable for economic and scientific reasons and also as areas for the future preservation of fauna and flora and geologic structures in their natural state' (Resolution 713 (XXVII)). The first UN List of Protected Areas, as it became known, was subsequently published in 1962. Since this time, there have been several decisions from the Conference of the Parties to the Convention on Biological Diversity (CBD) encouraging Parties to share and update relevant information on their protected area networks with the WDPA.

The WD-OECM was created in 2019 in response to a decision of the Conference of the Parties to the Convention on Biological Diversity in November 2018. The decision also encouraged Parties to report data to the newly formed database.

== Content ==
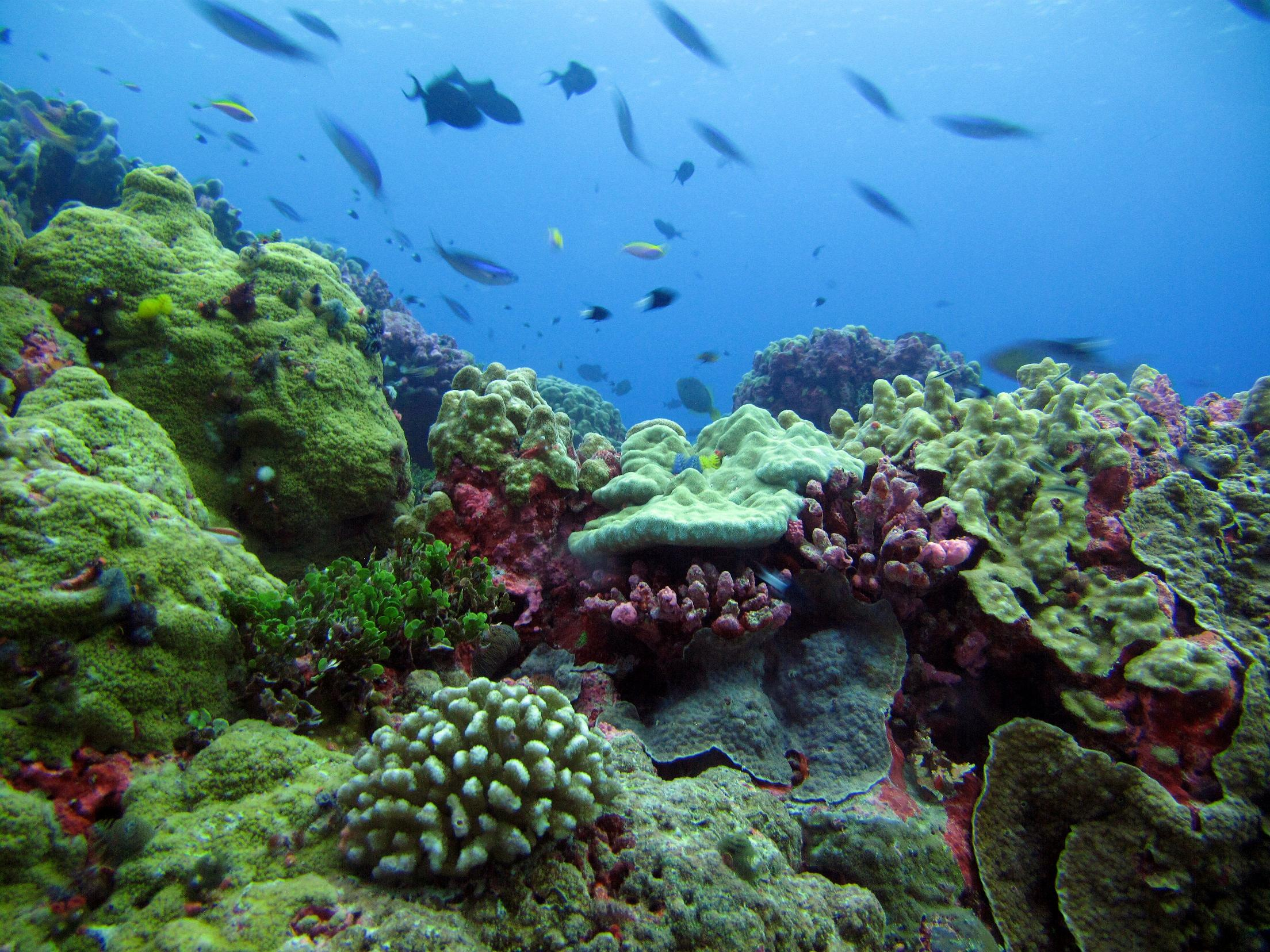
Coral reefs near Enderbury Island, Phoenix Islands Protected Area, a marine protected area in the WDPCA.

The WDPCA collates data on protected areas and OECMs as defined by the IUCN and the CBD. There are two widely accepted global definitions of a protected area, which are considered equivalent:

- The IUCN defines a protected area as: “A clearly defined geographical space, recognised, dedicated and managed, through legal or other effective means, to achieve the long-term conservation of nature with associated ecosystem services and cultural values”.
- The CBD defines a protected area as: “A geographically defined area, which is designated or regulated and managed to achieve specific conservation objectives”.

Other effective area-based conservation measures (OECMs) are a far newer concept than protected areas. The term ‘OECM’ first appeared in 2010 within the wording of Aichi Biodiversity Target 11 and has been retained within Target 3 of the Kunming-Montreal Global Biodiversity Framework.

- OECMs were formally defined by the CBD in 2018 as: “A geographically defined area other than a Protected Area, which is governed and managed in ways that achieve positive and sustained long-term outcomes for the in situ conservation of biodiversity, with associated ecosystem functions and services and where applicable, cultural, spiritual, socio–economic, and other locally relevant values.”

National authorities report data on protected areas and OECMs to the WDPCA following these definitions and/or their own national legislation and policies.

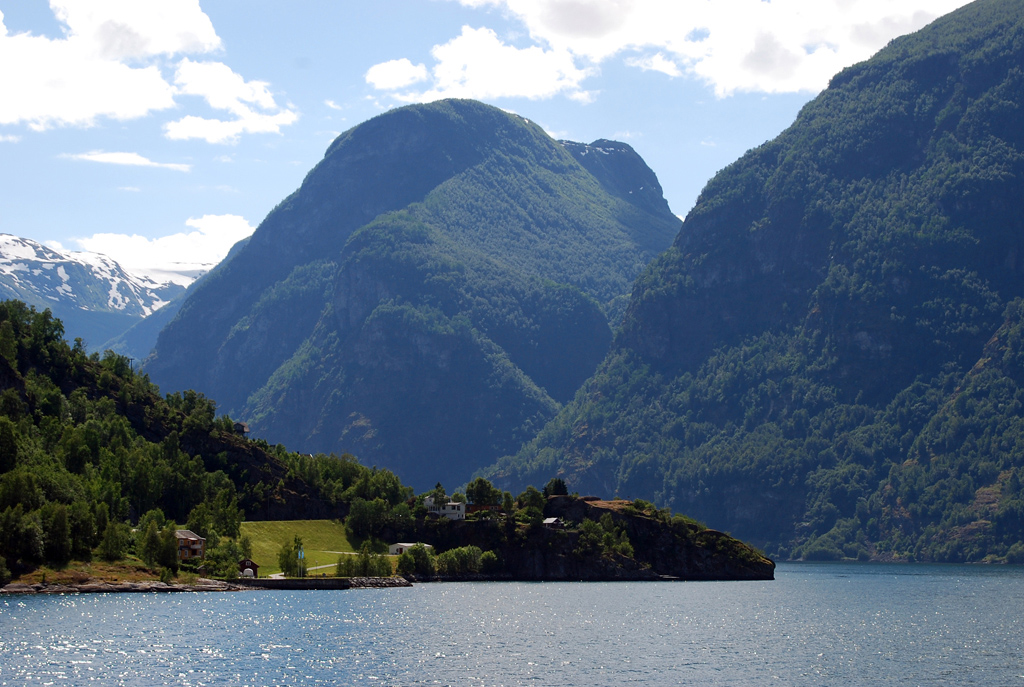
Nærøyfjord UNESCO World Heritage Site.

The WDPCA collates information on protected areas and OECMs that have been recognised at either the national level or the international level. Many areas are recognised internationally for their exceptional biodiversity, conservation and sustainable development values. These include sites recognised under the United Nations Educational, Scientific and Cultural Organization (UNESCO) World Heritage Convention, UNESCO Man and Biosphere Reserve Programme, and the Ramsar Convention on Wetlands of International Importance especially as Waterfowl Habitat (Ramsar Convention). In some cases, geographical areas can be recognised under multiple designations (both national and international).

=== Structure of the database ===
The WDPCA contains spatial data (points and polygons) and associated tabular information on protected areas and OECMs. The database is updated monthly and made available through the Protected Planet online platform, where users can explore and download the latest information.

The WDPCA is stored as a file geodatabase comprising two geospatial feature classes and one table containing information on the source of the data:

- Two feature classes: one with polygons representing site boundaries and one with point locations representing the centre-point location. Each protected area or OECM is represented by either a polygon or point. Both feature classes have associated tabular data describing key attributes of the protected area or OECM. There are 34 tabular fields within the WDPCA, which are outlined in the database manual.
- One source table: the WDPCA source table describes the source of geospatial and attribute data, containing information on the data provider, year of latest update, and other metadata.

== Uses ==
The WDPCA provides the most up to date and comprehensive global data on the distribution and coverage of protected areas and OECMs, which can be used by diverse actors across multiple sectors. Through Protected Planet, the WDPCA is openly available for non-commercial purposes, including for scientific research, education, and to support decision-makers and other stakeholders to identify priority conservation actions, funding and capacity needs. Key users of the WDPCA include government agencies, non-governmental organisations, inter-governmental agencies, and academics.

Some of the key uses of the WDPCA include:

- Monitoring global progress towards international goals and targets, including Target 3 of the Kunming-Montreal Global Biodiversity Framework and Sustainable Development Goals 14 and 15 of the UN 2030 Agenda for Sustainable Development.
- Assessing the status of global, regional and national area-based conservation efforts, including through providing core indicators of the Intergovernmental Science-Policy Platform on Biodiversity and Ecosystem Services (IPBES), and other international assessments and reports including the Global Biodiversity Outlook.
- Supporting nature-related decision-making through decision-support tools such as the UN Biodiversity Lab, the Digital Observatory for Protected Areas (DOPA), and Global Forest Watch. Through these tools, the WDPCA is used alongside other key biodiversity datasets and earth observation layers to map, monitor and assess pressures on protected areas and OECMs, report on biodiversity targets, and ensure nature is at the heart of sustainable development.
- Informing conservation action through scientific research and gap analyses. Alongside other biodiversity datasets, the WDPCA is used to understand the extent, location and effectiveness of protected areas and OECMs, and how these areas conserve biomes, habitats, and species. This knowledge can help inform future action, including the establishment and expansion of area-based conservation measures.

The WDPCA can also be accessed and used by commercial organisations, and for commercial purposes, through the Integrated Biodiversity Assessment Tool (IBAT). This decision support tool provides commercial entities with access to up-to-date biodiversity datasets, including the WDPCA, that enable them to assess nature-related risks and opportunities. Through IBAT, the WDPCA can be used to support organisations to comply with the environmental safeguard policies established by national governments, industry groups such as the International Council on Mining and Metals (ICMM), and major development and investment banks. It also provides organisations with the tools to conduct Risk Assessments and Environmental Impact Assessments. Utilising the WDPCA, commercial entities across a range of industries can plan their activities away from important conservation areas, ensuring a balance between development and conservation is achieved.
