= Shaowen Wang =

Geospatial researcher

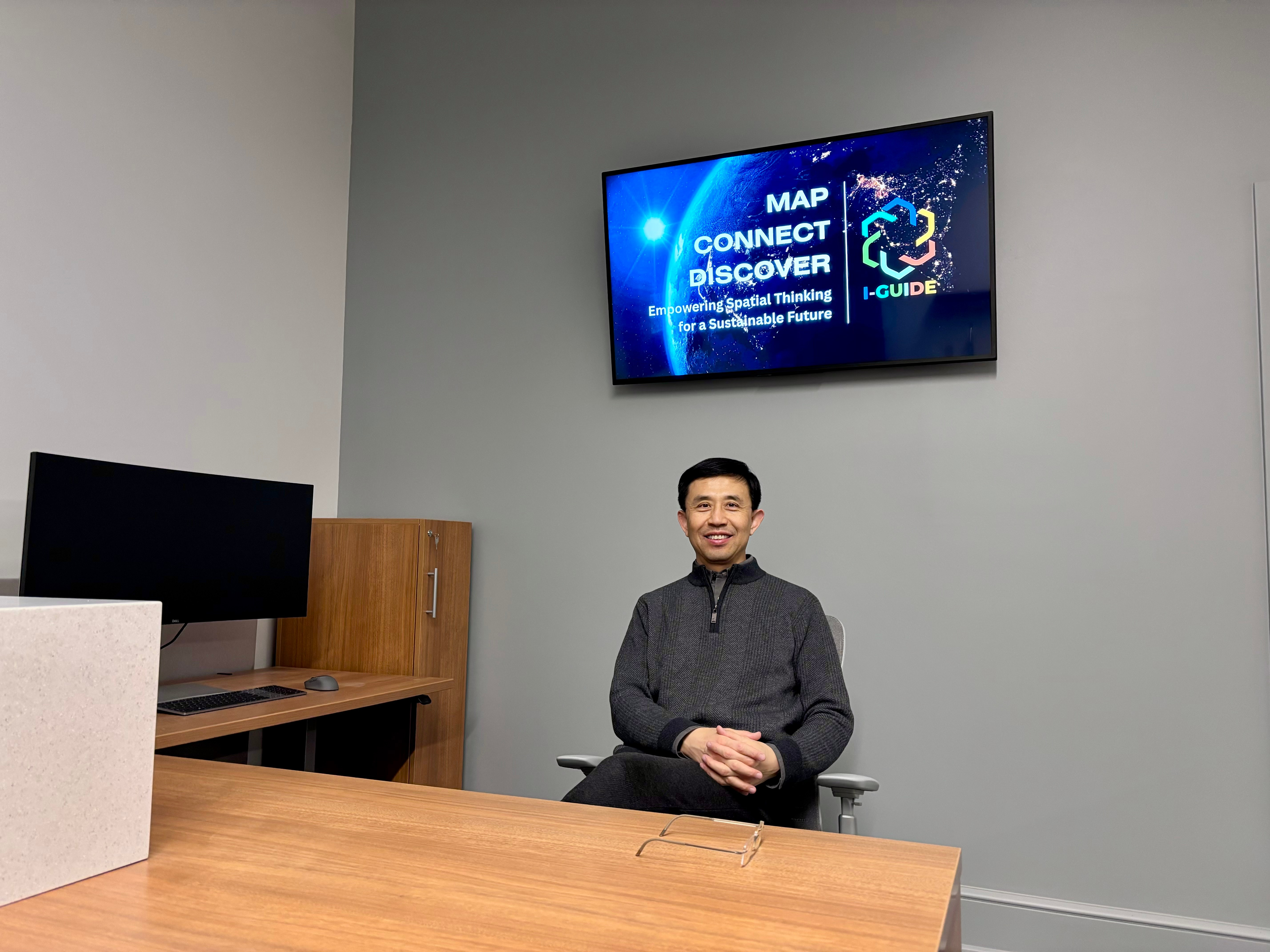
- Shaowen Wang, Professor at the University of Illinois Urbana-Champaign
- Born: 1973 (age 52–53); Shanxi, China
- Education: Tianjin University (BS); Peking University (MS); University of Iowa (MS, PhD)
- Known for: CyberGIS
- Awards: AAAS Fellow (2021); AAG Fellow (2022); UCGIS Fellow (2024)
- Scientific career
- Fields: Geographic information science, Cyberinfrastructure, High-performance computing
- Workplaces: University of Illinois Urbana-Champaign; National Center for Supercomputing Applications
- Website: shaowen.web.illinois.edu

Shaowen Wang is a geographic information scientist, geographer, and computer scientist. He is a professor in the Department of Geography and Geographic Information Science and the Siebel School of Computing and Data Science at the University of Illinois Urbana-Champaign (UIUC). Wang's research focuses on integrating geographic information systems and spatial analysis with high-performance computing to address complex geospatial problems and sustainability challenges, particularly through the development of CyberGIS (cyber geographic information science and systems). Wang was elected a Fellow of the American Association for the Advancement of Science (AAAS) in 2021 and a Fellow of the American Association of Geographers (AAG) in 2022. Since 2013, Wang has served as the founding director of the CyberGIS Center for Advanced Digital and Spatial Studies and is the Principal Investigator of the National Science Foundation (NSF) Institute for Geospatial Understanding through an Integrative Discovery Environment (I-GUIDE).

== Early life and education ==
Wang was born in 1973 and raised in the northern region of Shanxi Province, China. He attended Tianjin University, where he received a Bachelor of Science in Computer Engineering in 1995. He subsequently earned a Master of Science in geography from Peking University in 1998. Wang then moved to the United States for graduate studies at the University of Iowa, completing a Master of Computer Science in 2002 and a Ph.D. in geography in 2004. His doctoral dissertation, supervised by Marc P. Armstrong, focused on computational geography.

== Research and career ==
Wang joined the faculty of the University of Illinois Urbana-Champaign in 2007. Between 2010 and 2017, Wang was the associate director of the National Center for Supercomputing Applications (NCSA) for CyberGIS. During that time, he led the development of ROGER, a supercomputer optimized for geospatial data-intensive sciences. Wang served as Head of the Department of Geography and Geographic Information Science at UIUC from 2017 to 2023. He holds the position of Associate Dean for Natural and Mathematical Sciences in the College of Liberal Arts & Sciences at UIUC.

As principal investigator, Wang has directed over $30 million research awards and grants. His work has been supported by industry partners and a variety of U.S. government agencies, including the NSF, the Centers for Disease Control and Prevention (CDC), the Department of Energy (DOE), the Environmental Protection Agency (EPA), National Aeronautics and Space Administration (NASA), and the National Institutes of Health (NIH).

== Community service and leadership ==
Wang served as the President of the University Consortium for Geographic Information Science (UCGIS) from 2016 to 2017 and as the President of the International Association of Chinese Professionals in Geographic Information Science (CPGIS) from 2013 to 2014. From 2015 to 2020, Wang was a member of the Board on Earth Sciences and Resources of the National Academies of Sciences, Engineering, and Medicine.

== Honors and awards ==
2024: Fellow, University Consortium for Geographic Information Science (UCGIS)

2022: Fellow, American Association of Geographers (AAG)

2022: AAG Distinguished Scholarship Honors

2021: Fellow, American Association for the Advancement of Science (AAAS)

2021: Getis-Ord Lecture in Spatial Analysis, the 60th Anniversary Meeting of the Western Regional Science Association

2019: Borchert Lecture, the University of Minnesota

2009: NSF CAREER Award

== Selected publications ==
Wang has published over 200 peer-reviewed works.

Wang, S.; Armstrong, M. P. (2009). "A Theoretical Approach to the Use of Cyberinfrastructure in Geographical Analysis". International Journal of Geographical Information Science. 23 (2): 169–193. doi:10.1080/13658810802422071 (inactive 19 July 2026).

Wang, S. (2010). "A CyberGIS Framework for the Synthesis of Cyberinfrastructure, GIS, and Spatial Analysis". Annals of the Association of American Geographers. 100 (3): 535–557. Bibcode:2010AAAG..100..535W. doi:10.1080/00045601003791243.

Wang, S.; Goodchild, M. F., eds. (2019). CyberGIS for Geospatial Discovery and Innovation. Springer. ISBN 978-9402415292.
