= Geographical Analysis (journal) =

- Discipline: Geography
- Language: English
- Edited by: Elizabeth Delmelle

Publication details
- History: 1969–present
- Publisher: Wiley-Blackwell on behalf of the Ohio State University
- Frequency: Quarterly
- Impact factor: 2.4 (2025)

Standard abbreviations
- ISO 4: Geogr. Anal.

Indexing
- CODEN: GPHAA4
- ISSN: 0016-7363 (print); 1538-4632 (web)
- LCCN: 75005179
- OCLC no.: 610394749

Links
- Journal homepage; Online access; Online archive

Geographical Analysis is a quarterly peer-reviewed academic journal published by Wiley-Blackwell on behalf of the Department of Geography (Ohio State University). It was established in 1969 and the current editor is Elizabeth Delmelle (University of Pennsylvania). The journal covers geographical theory, model building, and quantitative methods. These topics together are frequently referred to as geospatial analysis.

According to the Journal Citation Reports, the journal has a 2025 impact factor of 2.4.
