= Cartography and Geographic Information Society =

The Cartography and Geographic Information Society (CaGIS) is a learned society in the fields of cartography and geographic information science. It includes the U.S. National Committee for the International Cartographic Association (ICA). It started in 1974 as the Cartography Division of the American Congress for Surveying and Mapping (ACSM); in 1981 the division became the American Cartographic Association, and in 1996 it received its current name.

Its official academic journal is titled Cartography and Geographic Information Science, and is published on behalf of CaGIS by Taylor & Francis. It also hosts the AutoCarto conference series, previously known as International Symposium on Computer-Assisted Cartography (subject also known as automated cartography, hence the name).

== See also ==
- North American Cartographic Information Society
