= COGO =

Civil engineering geometry program

COGO is a suite of programs used in civil engineering for modelling horizontal and vertical alignments and solving coordinate geometry problems. Cogo alignments are used as controls for the geometric design of roads, railways, and stream relocations or restorations.

COGO was originally a subsystem of MIT's Integrated Civil Engineering System (ICES), developed in the 1960s. Other ICES subsystems included STRUDL, BRIDGE, LEASE, PROJECT, ROADS and TRANSET, and the internal languages ICETRAN and CDL. Evolved versions of COGO are still widely used.

Some basic types of elements of COGO are points, Euler spirals, lines and horizontal curves (circular arcs).

More complex elements can be developed such as alignments or chains which are made up of a combination of points, curves or spirals.
