= Xerox PARC Map Viewer =

Static web mapping site

Xerox PARC Map Viewer was one of the earliest static web mapping sites, developed by Steve Putz in June 1993 at Xerox Corporation's Palo Alto Research Center (PARC). The Xerox PARC Map Viewer was an experiment in providing interactive information retrieval, rather than access to just static files, on the World Wide Web.

Map Viewer used a customized CGI server module written in Perl. Map images were generated in GIF format from two server side programs. MAP-WRITER created the raster images from the geographic database and RASTOGIF would convert the raster image into the GIF format.

Xerox has since discontinued the Map Viewer service.
