= SNN (gene) =

Protein-coding gene in the species Homo sapiens

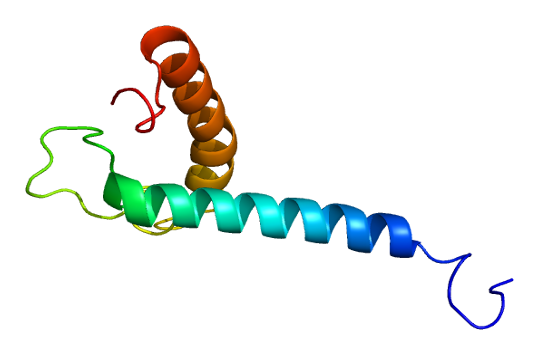
Available structures
PDB	Ortholog search: PDBe RCSB
PDB	List of PDB id codes 1ZZA

Identifiers
- Aliases: SNN, stannin
- External IDs: OMIM: 603032; MGI: 1276549; HomoloGene: 81710; GeneCards: SNN; OMA:SNN - orthologs

Gene location (Human)
Chr.	Chromosome 16 (human)
Band	16p13.13	Start	11,668,455 bp
Band	16p13.13	End	11,679,152 bp

Gene location (Mouse)
Chr.	Chromosome 16 (mouse)
Band	16|16 A1	Start	10,878,809 bp
Band	16|16 A1	End	10,892,849 bp
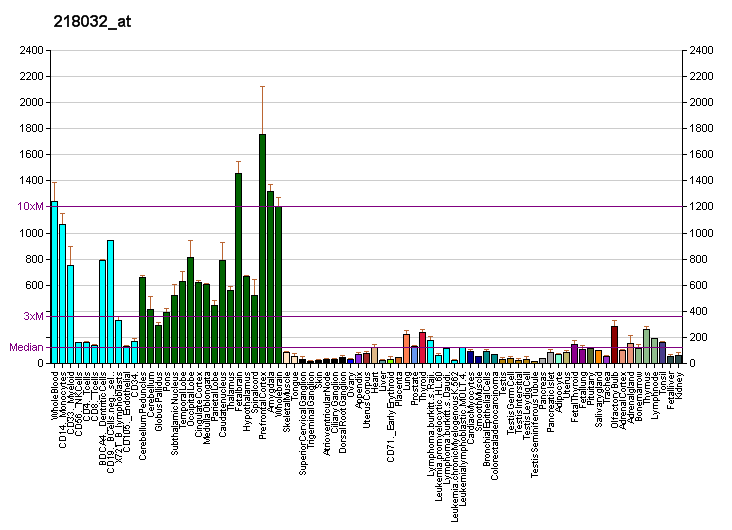

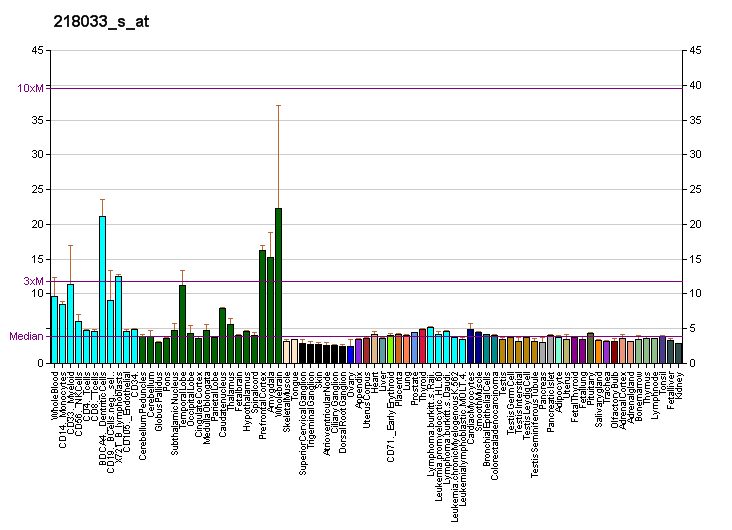
RNA expression pattern
Bgee	Human / Mouse (ortholog); Top expressed in: middle temporal gyrus; endothelial cell; external globus pallidus; entorhinal cortex; Brodmann area 23; Region I of hippocampus proper; putamen; caudate nucleus; superior frontal gyrus; postcentral gyrus / Top expressed in: mesenteric lymph nodes; olfactory tubercle; ventricular zone; medial ganglionic eminence; globus pallidus; substantia nigra; superior frontal gyrus; otolith organ; dentate gyrus of hippocampal formation granule cell; utricle; More reference expression data
BioGPS	More reference expression data
Gene ontology
Molecular function	metal ion binding
Cellular component	mitochondrial outer membrane; membrane; mitochondrion; cytoplasm; integral component of membrane
Biological process	response to toxic substance
Sources:Amigo / QuickGO
Orthologs
Species	Human	Mouse
Entrez	8303	20621
Ensembl	ENSG00000184602	ENSMUSG00000037972
UniProt	O75324	P61807
RefSeq (mRNA)	NM_003498	NM_009223
RefSeq (protein)	NP_003489	NP_033249
Location (UCSC)	Chr 16: 11.67 – 11.68 Mb	Chr 16: 10.88 – 10.89 Mb
PubMed search
- Wikidata
View/Edit Human	View/Edit Mouse

Stannin is a protein that in humans is encoded by the SNN gene.
