= Cartography and Geographic Information Science =

- Discipline: Geography
- Language: English
- Edited by: Eric Delmelle

Publication details
- Former names: The American Cartographer; Cartography and Geographic Information Systems
- History: 1974–present
- Publisher: Taylor & Francis
- Frequency: Bimonthly
- Impact factor: 2.7 (2025)

Standard abbreviations
- ISO 4: Cartogr. Geogr. Inf. Sci.

Indexing
- ISSN: 1523-0406 (print); 1545-0465 (web)

Links
- Journal homepage

Cartography and Geographic Information Science is an academic journal about cartography and geographic information science published by Taylor & Francis on behalf of the U.S. Cartography and Geographic Information Society, in affiliation with the International Cartographic Association. Its editor-in-chief is Eric Delmelle; its 2025 impact factor is 2.7.

It started in 1974 as The American Cartographer, was renamed in 1990 to Cartography and Geographic Information Systems, and in 1999 received its current name.

== Indexing ==
The journal is abstracted and indexed in the following bibliographic databases:

- Academic Search Premier
- Applied Science & Technology Source
- Compendex
- Computer & Applied Sciences
- Environment Index
- INSPEC
- GEOBASE
- Google Scholar
- Scopus
- Social Sciences Citation Index
- vLex
