= AM/FM/GIS =

Subset of Geographic Information System

AM/FM/GIS stands for Automated Mapping (AM), Facilities Management (FM), and Geographic Information Systems (GIS). It is a subset of GIS associated with public utilities like gas, electric, water and telecommunications. The term AM/FM/GIS mostly refers to GIS software that allows utility users to digitize, manage and analyze their utility network data. This data is stored in an underlying GIS database which also maintains the associations between the graphical entities and the attributes.

== Components ==
There are mainly two major components of any AM/FM/GIS system, the graphical component and the database component. .

=== Graphical component ===
The graphical component, as the term suggests, deals with graphical data which can consist of different types of real world entities or objects represented graphically by shapes or geometries. For example, a street or road can be graphically represented by a linear geometry or a line. Other types of graphical objects can be individual symbols representing single location point objects like road markers. Areas are often represented by polygons especially for objects like boundaries. The system allows the user to configure different geometry styles for different type of real world objects. There are tools available within the system to digitize or create the graphical objects.

=== Database component ===
The database component, as the term suggests, mainly deals with the database part which stores the attribute data for the real world entities that need to be captured or managed as a part of the digitization process. This attribute data is often stored in an underlying relational database. A database table often represents a single real world entity or object and will be used to store relevant attribute data. The database component is often linked or associated with the graphical component to complete an intelligent GIS system.

== Architecture ==
An AM/FM/GIS system's architecture depends solely on the requirements defined by a public utility. These requirements are mostly industry standards and seldom require changes. A good AM/FM/GIS system evolves with the industry changes that may take place from time to time. In order to accommodate these changes, the software is equipped with data model tools and rule base change mechanism that allow system architects to customize the system if needed and make it more intelligent.

The AM/FM/GIS system data model allow GIS architects to define a relationship model which consists of all the database tables and their dependencies. This is often combined with business rules to make the system more intelligent so that it can be utilized in running various analysis on the data. E.g. a gas pipeline GIS system can let the users perform detailed analysis of all the pressure points or valves located on the pipe at different intervals. This can be possible by defining a relationship between a pipeline entity or object and the pressure valve object. Designing a data model for any utility company could be an extensive task which involves requirements gathering and analysis, designing specifications and implementation. Implementation mostly deals with development of functional tools to assist users in managing and analyzing the system. These functional tools might include object placement tools, analysis tools, reporting tools etc. The functional tool development is generally done using a supporting programming language. An advanced AM/FM/GIS software is always equipped with pre-defined functions and procedures to carry out common GIS operations.

== Advantages ==
GIS technology allows organizations to replace paper maps with digital mapping systems. AM/FM/GIS systems combine automated mapping, facilities management and geographic information systems capabilities to support mapping, data management, and infrastructure development.

The public utility companies have changed significantly in the past decade. With increasing demand, there is tremendous pressure on the utility companies to improve their business. Companies have been looking at information systems to re-organize their business processes and benefit from it. Some AM/FM/GIS systems offer full-fledged solutions to companies by supporting their existing business processes. Some of these solutions are -

- Utilizing an existing GIS system.
- Supporting Workflow Management Systems (WMS)
- Integration with Customer Information Systems
- Integration with Operations Support Systems (OSS)
- Integration with Planning and Engineering
- Cost analysis
- Inventory Management

== See also ==
- Geographical Information System
