= GIS Day =

Annual geographic information systems public outreach day

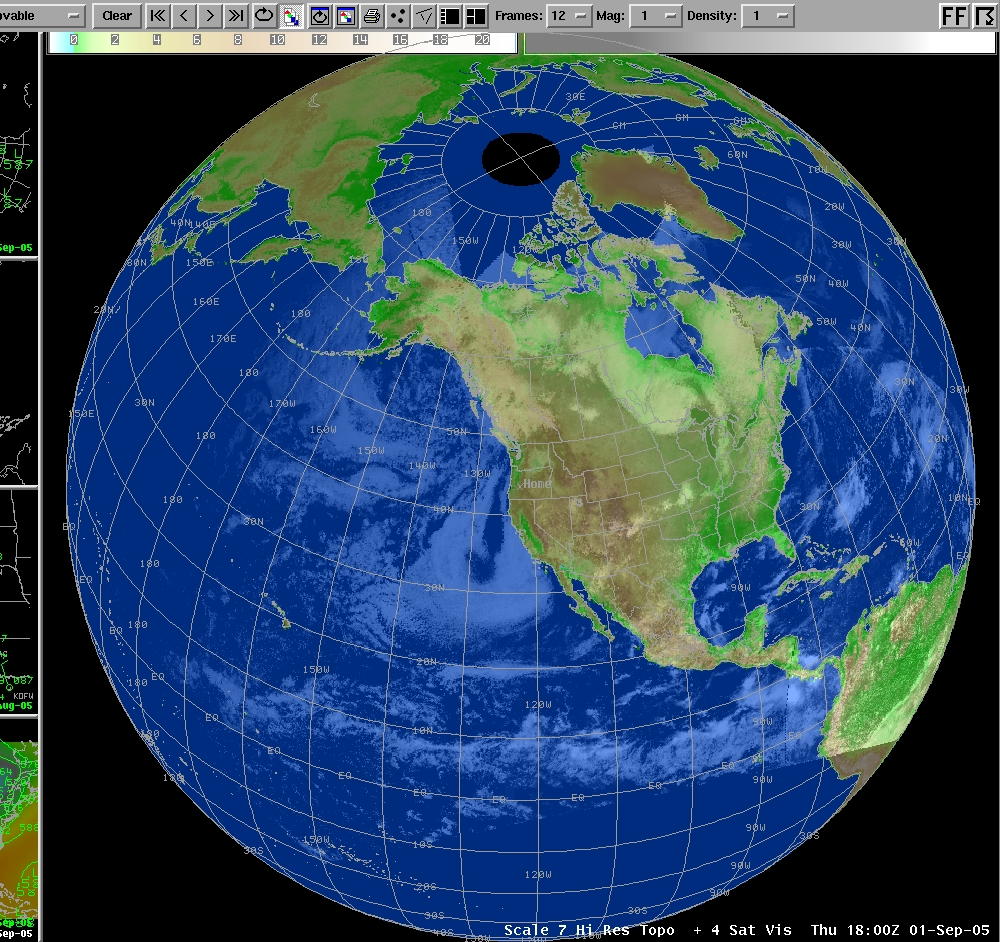
- NOAA Earth System image, a GIS example
- Also called: Geographic Information Systems Day
- Observed by: Worldwide
- Significance: To promote awareness and understanding of Geographic Information Systems technology and its application.
- Celebrations: Educational workshops and seminars, map exhibitions and competitions, community mapping projects, guest lectures and panel discussions, interactive demonstrations, etc.
- Date: Third Wednesday in November
- 2025 date: November 19
- 2026 date: November 18
- 2027 date: November 17
- 2028 date: November 15
- Frequency: Annual
- First time: November 1999
- Related to: Geography Awareness Week

GIS Day is an annual event celebrating geographic information systems (GIS) based technologies on the third Wednesday of November. The event first took place in 1999. It was initiated by spatial analytics software provider Esri. Esri president and co-founder Jack Dangermond credits Ralph Nader with inspiring the creation of GIS Day. He considered the event a good initiative for people to learn about geography and the many uses of GIS. He wanted GIS Day to be a grassroots effort and open to everyone to participate.

Today, the event provides an international forum for users of GIS technology from across the GIS industry to demonstrate real-world applications that are making a difference in society. Originally the Canada Geographic Information System developed in the 1960s by Roger Tomlinson, it is now used worldwide.

Original sponsors of GIS Day included the following organizations:

- National Geographic Society
- American Association of Geographers (AAG), formerly Association of American Geographers
- University Consortium for Geographic Information Science (UCGIS)
- United States Geological Survey (USGS)
- Library of Congress
- Sun Microsystems
- Hewlett-Packard
- Esri
- King Saud University

== Additional resources ==
- GeoMentors Program
