= North American Cartographic Information Society =

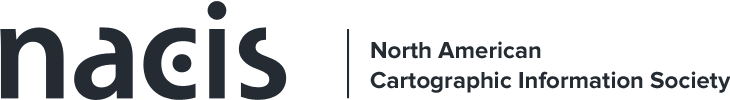
- Abbreviation: NACIS
- Established: 1980; 46 years ago
- Region served: North America
- Fields: Cartography
- Website: nacis.org

The North American Cartographic Information Society (NACIS) is a US-based cartographic society founded in 1980. It was founded by specialists in cartography, which included government mapmakers, map librarians, cartography professors and cartography lab directors. It now represents a broad mixture of academic, government and commercial interests, with a sizeable proportion of working cartographers. Many NACIS members come from related vocations (e.g. art, design, information visualization, GIS, historical research, and software development.) NACIS offers both volunteer opportunities and travel grants for students and members of the community.

== Objectives ==
- To improve communication, coordination and cooperation among the producers, disseminators, curators, and users of cartographic information, and of the infrastructure that supports it.
- To collaborate with other organizations and institutions involved in cartographic knowledge to advance the field.
- To promote cartographic education and responsible map-making.
- To support the development of emerging and established researchers and practitioners.
- To foster the refinement and innovation of cartographic practices in the creation, dissemination, and appreciation of maps and related materials.

== Membership ==
The membership is largely from the United States and Canada, with a small but steady number from other countries. In recent years, NACIS has focused on increasing membership in Latin America and the Caribbean.

== Conference ==
NACIS hosts an annual conference in the fall at a variety of locations around North America.

1980: Milwaukee, Wisconsin
1981: Gatlinburg, Tennessee
1982: Arlington, Virginia
1983: Milwaukee, Wisconsin
1984: Pittsburgh, Pennsylvania
1985: Chicago, Illinois
1986: Philadelphia, Pennsylvania
1987: Atlanta, Georgia
1988: Denver, Colorado
1989: Ann Arbor, Michigan
1990: Orlando, Florida
1991: Milwaukee, Wisconsin
1992: St. Paul, Minnesota
1993: Silver Spring, Maryland
1994: Ottawa, Ontario
1995: Wilmington, North Carolina
1996: San Antonio, Texas
1997: Lexington, Kentucky
1998: Milwaukee, Wisconsin
1999: Williamsburg, Virginia
2000: Knoxville, Tennessee
2001: Portland, Oregon
2002: Columbus, Ohio
2003: Jacksonville, Florida
2004: Portland, Maine
2005: Salt Lake City, Utah
2006: Madison, Wisconsin
2007: St Louis, Missouri
2008: Missoula, Montana
2009: Sacramento, California
2010: Madison, Wisconsin
2011: St. Petersburg, Florida
2012: Portland, Oregon
2013: Greenville, South Carolina
2014: Pittsburgh, Pennsylvania
2015: Minneapolis, Minnesota
2016: Colorado Springs, Colorado
2017: Montréal, Quebec
2018: Norfolk, Virginia
2019: Tacoma, Washington
2020: Null Island (Virtual Conference)
2021: Oklahoma City, Oklahoma and hybrid virtual
2022: Minneapolis, Minnesota
2023: Pittsburgh, Pennsylvania
2024: Tacoma, Washington
2025: Louisville, Kentucky
2026: Milwaukee, Wisconsin

== Publications ==
NACIS publishes a triannual journal, Cartographic Perspectives (available online as open-access) and the Atlas of Design, a biennial publication showcasing innovative maps designed by cartographers from around the world.

== Initiatives ==
The organization is a sponsor of Natural Earth, a public domain cartographic dataset available at 1:10 million, 1:50 million, and 1:110 million scales.

== See also ==
- Cartography and Geographic Information Society
