= Spatial neural network =

Category of tailored neural networks

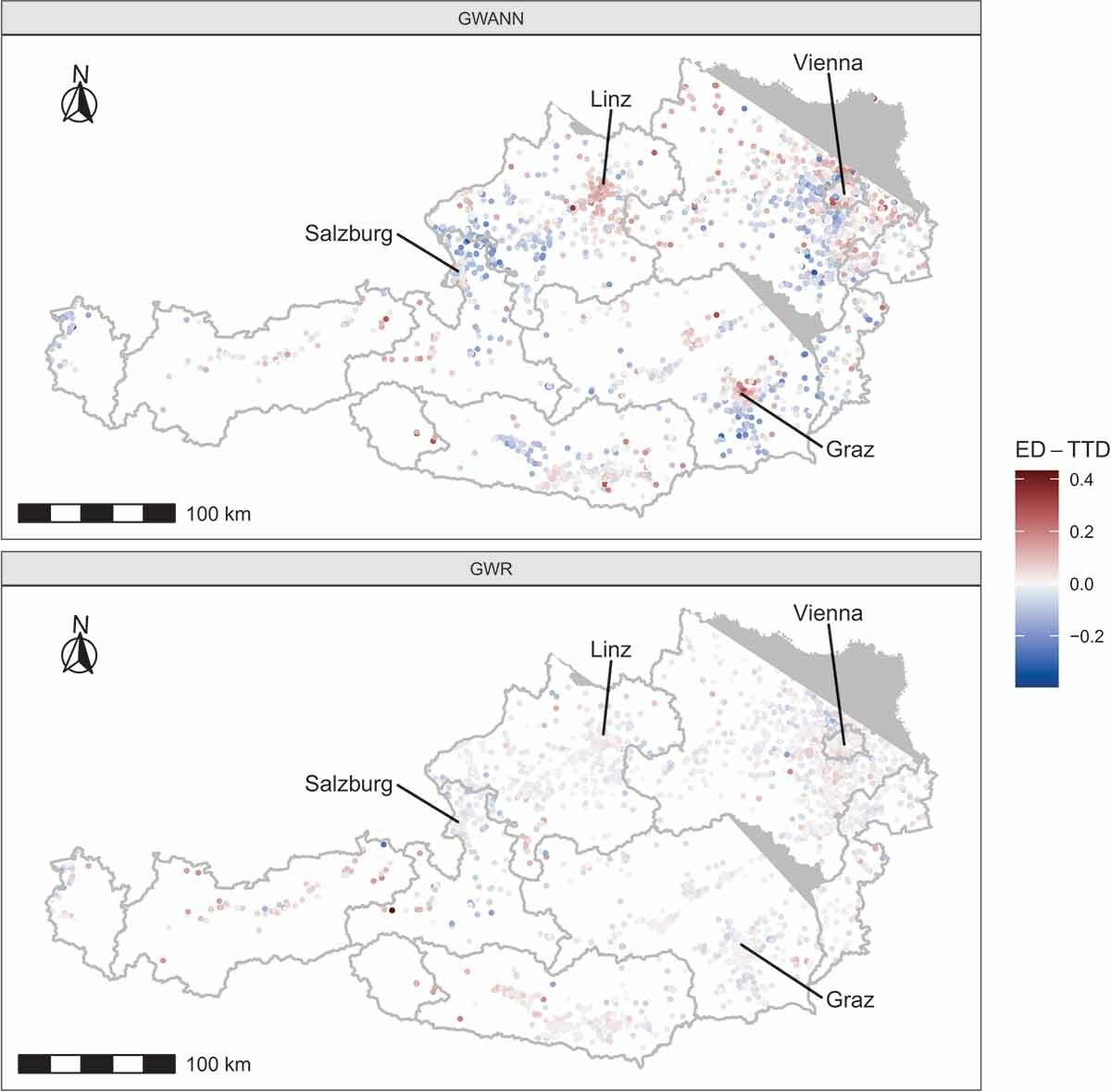
Difference in predicted house prices within the states of Austria, from a GWR and a GWNN whose the weighting metrics respectively use the Euclidean distance (ED) and travel time distance (TTD)

Spatial neural networks (SNNs) constitute a supercategory of tailored neural networks (NNs) for representing and predicting geographic phenomena. They generally improve both the statistical accuracy and reliability of the a-spatial/classic NNs whenever they handle geo-spatial datasets, and also of the other spatial (statistical) models (e.g. spatial regression models) whenever the geo-spatial datasets' variables depict non-linear relations.

== History ==
Openshaw (1993) and Hewitson et al. (1994) started investigating the applications of the a-spatial/classic NNs to geographic phenomena. They observed that a-spatial/classic NNs outperform the other extensively applied a-spatial/classic statistical models (e.g. regression models, clustering algorithms, maximum likelihood classifications) in geography, especially when there exist non-linear relations between the geo-spatial datasets' variables. Thereafter, Openshaw (1998) also compared these a-spatial/classic NNs with other modern and original a-spatial statistical models at that time (i.e. fuzzy logic models, genetic algorithm models); he concluded that the a-spatial/classic NNs are statistically competitive. Thereafter scientists developed several categories of SNNs – see below.

== Spatial models ==
Spatial statistical models (a.k.a. geographically weighted models, or merely spatial models) like the geographically weighted regressions (GWRs), SNNs, etc., are spatially tailored (a-spatial/classic) statistical models, so to learn and model the deterministic components of the spatial variability (i.e. spatial dependence/autocorrelation, spatial heterogeneity, spatial association/cross-correlation) from the geo-locations of the geo-spatial datasets' (statistical) individuals/units.

== Categories ==
There exist several categories of methods/approaches for designing and applying SNNs.

- One-Size-Fits-all (OSFA) spatial neural networks, use the OSFA method/approach for globally computing the spatial weights and designing a spatial structure from the originally a-spatial/classic neural networks.
- Spatial Variability Aware Neural Networks (SVANNs) use an enhanced OSFA method/approach that locally recomputes the spatial weights and redesigns the spatial structure of the originally a-spatial/classic NNs, at each geo-location of the (statistical) individuals/units' attributes' values. They generally outperform the OSFA spatial neural networks, but they do not consistently handle the spatial heterogeneity at multiple scales.
- Geographically Weighted Neural Networks (GWNNs) are similar to the SVANNs but they use the so-called Geographically Weighted Model (GWM) method/approach by Lu et al. (2023), so to locally recompute the spatial weights and redesign the spatial structure of the originally a-spatial/classic neural networks. Like the SVANNs, they do not consistently handle spatial heterogeneity at multiple scales.

== Applications ==
There exist case-study applications of SNNs in:

- energy for predicting the electricity consumption;
- agriculture for classifying the vegetation;
- real estate for appraising the premises.

== See also ==
- Statistics
- Neural networks' supercategories
- Statistical software
- Quantitative geography
- Spatial analysis
- Geographic information system software (GIS software)
