= Keith C. Clarke =

American research cartographer and professor

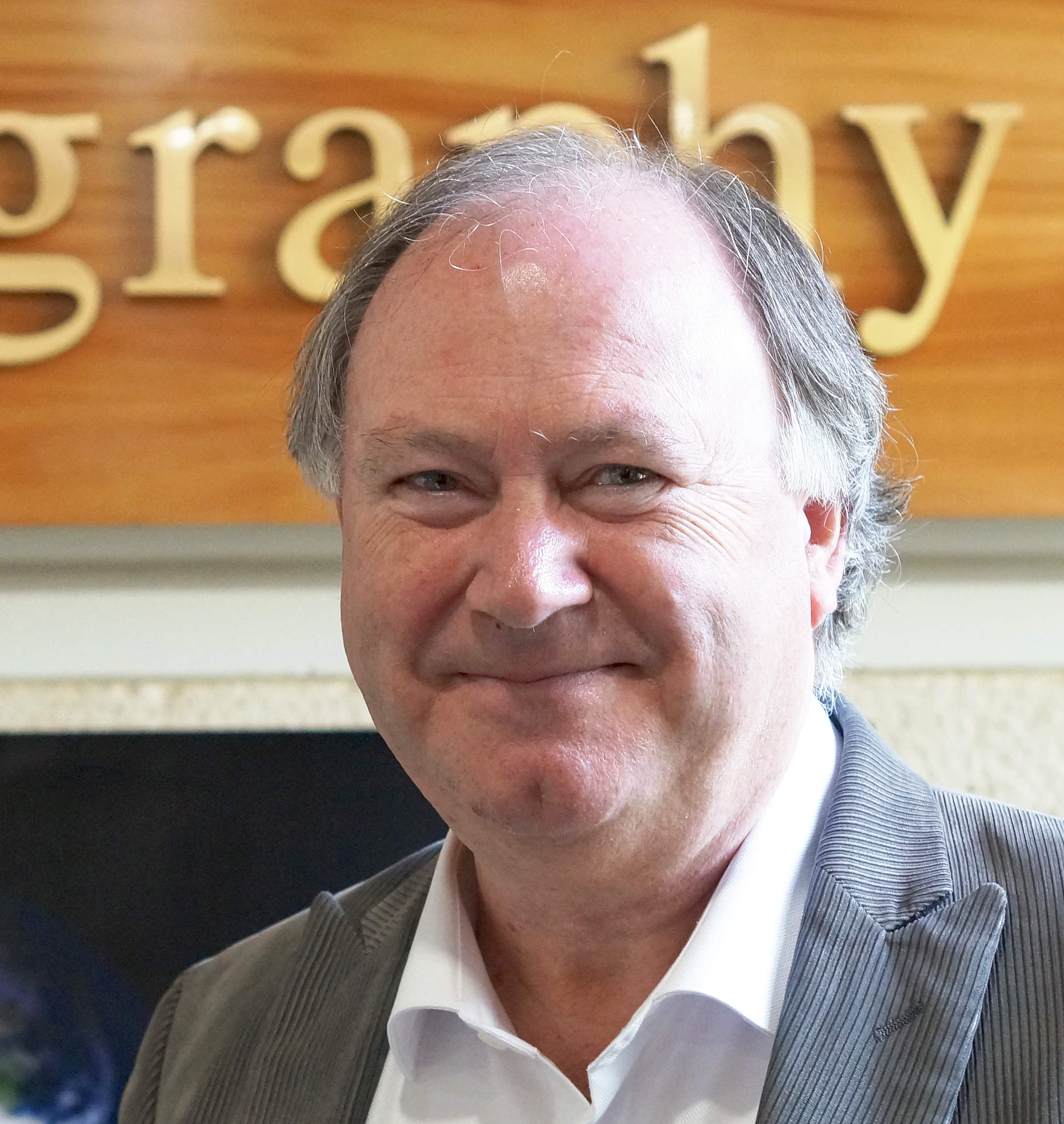
Keith C. Clarke in 2017

Keith Charles Clarke (born December 9, 1955) is a professor of Analytical Cartography and Modelling in the Department of Geography at the University of California, Santa Barbara, USA.

He is a Fellow of the American Association for the Advancement of Science and his research area is cartography and geographic information science.

== Career ==
Clarke's research has been on dynamic simulation models, spatial analysis and analytical cartography. As of July 2020 Google Scholar lists Clarke as having an h-index of 60 and an i10-index of 136. With a total number of citations of 19396, a key most cited paper reporting the first fully operational Urban Cellular Automaton Computer Model in 1997, counts 1714 citations, his second most cited paper introduced in 1998 key innovations in the linkages between cellular automaton (CA) and geographic information system (GIS). His third most cited paper introduced in 2003 pivotal innovation in linkages between spatial metrics, modelling and remote sensing using Ikonos satellite images.

Often used books by practitioners and researchers in GIS, spatial analysis and GIS teaching and research programmes include: Maps and Web Mapping, Getting Started with GIS, and Analytical and Computer Cartography. He was the North-American Editor of the International Journal of Geographical Information Systems.

Clarke is credited for producing one of the most used operational urban computer models—SLEUTH. SLEUTH is a CA, calibrated with Markov chain Monte Carlo – stochastic modelling, and recently includes genetic algorithm (GA) calibration. A staff member and former Director of the National Center for Geographic Information and Analysis (NCGIA) and a key figure in the development of space/time dynamic urban simulation models, spatial analysis and geographic information systems.

He is a Fellow of the American Association for the Advancement of Science. In 2018 he was awarded by the University Consortium for Geographic Information Science the Carolyn Merry mentoring Award "to recognize an individual who demonstrates exceptional mentoring abilities and practices".

== Education ==
- Middlesex Polytechnic, London, B.A., Honors in Geography and Economics, 1977
- University of Michigan, Ann Arbor, MI, M.A., 1979
- University of Michigan, Ann Arbor, MI, Ph.D., Geography (Analytical Cartography), 1982
