= John Alan Glennon =

American geologist (born 1970)

John Alan Glennon (born September 24, 1970) is an American geographer and explorer. His work has been mapping and describing caves and geysers.

== Discoveries and research ==
=== Caves ===
In 1996, Glennon and Jon Jasper discovered an entrance to the Martin Ridge Cave System, Kentucky, and explored connections to nearby Jackpot and Whigpistle Caves (Groves, C.G. 1998). The combined cave system is 51 kilometers (32 mi) long (Gulden, B. 2005). The cave is hydrologically connected to Mammoth Cave---the world's longest cave (Quinlan J.F. and Ray, J. 1989). Glennon also was involved in the discovery of one of the largest cave chambers in Kentucky (Yonker, R. 2003).

=== Geysers ===
In 2002, Glennon led an American expedition to El Tatio Geyser Field, Chile. The team produced the first comprehensive inventory and description of the geysers' behaviors. The resulting report concluded that the site was the world's third largest geyser field (Glennon, J.A. and Pfaff, R.M. 2003).

=== Hoffman Environmental Research Institute (HERI) ===
With Dr. Chris Groves, president of the Cave Research Foundation (2004-2006), Glennon cofounded HERI in 1999. The institute's mission is to study the environmental and geologic aspects of caves and karst landscapes. Headquartered at Western Kentucky University, HERI's major scientific focus has been on the karst issues of China.

== Background ==
Glennon was a geography Ph.D. student of Dr. Michael Frank Goodchild at the University of California, Santa Barbara and received his PhD in 2013. Goodchild is a pioneer in Geographic Information Science and discoverer of Castleguard Cave, Canada's longest cave. Glennon received a Master of Science in Geoscience from Western Kentucky University, 2001, and Bachelor of Science in Park Administration from Texas A&M University, 1994.

For his cave discoveries in Kentucky, Alan has been commissioned in the Honorable Order of Kentucky Colonels.

== Works authored ==
- Glennon, J.A., Pfaff, R.M. (2005). The operation and geography of carbon-dioxide-driven, cold-water geysers, GOSA Transactions, vol. 9, pp. 184–192.
- Glennon, J.A., Pfaff, R.M. (2003). The extraordinary thermal activity of El Tatio Geyser Field, Antofagasta Region, Chile, GOSA Transactions, vol 8. pp. 31–78.
- Glennon, J.A. (2001). Application of Morphometric Relationships to Active Flow Networks within the Mammoth Cave Watershed, M.Sc. Thesis, Bowling Green: Western Kentucky University, 87 p (includes a description of the discovery of Martin Ridge Cave).
- Gulden, B. (2005). USA longest caves. National Speleological Society GEO2 Committee. (web).
- Groves C.G. (1998). The Martin Ridge Cave System, Cave Research Foundation Newsletter.
- Quinlan, J. F. and Ray, J. (1989). Map of groundwater basins, surface drainage, major caves, flow routes, the potentiometric surface, and an index to the topographic maps in the Mammoth Cave Region south of the Green River, 2nd edition. Friends of the Karst, Mammoth Cave, KY.

=== Articles ===
- Associated Press: Cave Passage Explored
- Kentucky Living Magazine: Underground Rock Stars
- Western Scholar Magazine: Underworld Explorer
