= Andrew U. Frank =

- Born: February 3, 1948 (age 78); Bern, Switzerland
- Other name: André Frank
- Citizenship: Swiss; Austrian
- Education: ETH Zurich (Dipl.Ing.); ETH Zurich (Ph.D.)
- Occupation: Professor of Geoinformation
- Website: Andrew U. Frank's homepage

Andrew U. Frank (born February 3, 1948) was a Swiss-Austrian professor for geoinformation at Vienna University of Technology from 1992 until 2016. Previously he was Professor at the University of Maine at Orono. Frank was recognized for his achievements in the fields of spatial information theory, spatial database theory, and ontology in GIS in a special section in his honor in IJGIS.

== Career ==
He established a theory based course in Geographic Information Science in 1982 at the University of Maine at Orono and was the lead for the Maine participation in the winning proposal for the National Center for Geographic Information and Analysis where he served from 1988 onwards as Associate Director and lead the operations at University of Maine. In 1992 he was appointed to the chair in Geoinformation at Vienna University of Technology. In 2016 he became emeritus professor at the same institution.

== Education ==
- Ph.D., Geodesy, ETH Zurich, 1982
- Dipl.Ing., Kulturingenieur, ETH Zurich, 1978

== Scholarship ==
=== Data storage and query languages for Geographic Data ===
The results of Frank's Ph.D. thesis were published in 1981 as "Application of DBMS to land information systems" in the Very Large Database Conference and in the following year as "MAPQUERY: Data Base Query Language for Retrieval of Geometric Data and their Graphical Representation". From this line of research resulted eventually "Towards a Spatial Query Language: User Interface Considerations" (with Max J. Egenhofer) published 1988 again in VLDB and the DE-9IM standard.

=== Spatial Theory and Spatial Languages ===
He organized with David M. Mark the NATO financed conference "Cognitive and Linguistic Aspects of Geographic Space" in Las Navas del Marqués.

He published two articles "Qualitative spatial reasoning about distances and directions in geographic space" and "Qualitative spatial reasoning: Cardinal directions as an example".

=== Ontology for GIS ===
Together with Sabine Timpf he published "Multiple representations for cartographic objects in a multi-scale tree—An intelligent graphical zoom" and refined the ideas to "Tiers of ontology and consistency constraints in geographical information systems". With Peter A. Burrough he edited a book collecting contributions on "Geographic Objects with Indeterminate Boundaries".

=== Land Tenure ===
Andrew Frank was involved in a number of international cadastral projects, most importantly a project funded by the U.S. AID to introduce a cadastre in Ecuador.

== Advisees ==
Andrew Frank "has supervised nearly 40 PhD students, many of whom are now leaders in GIScience", among others:

- Yvan Bédard (Professor emeritus, Laval University; first advisor Earl F. Epstein)
- Thomas Bittner (Professor of Geography, University at Buffalo)
- Max Egenhofer (Professor of Geoinformation, University of Maine)
- Alenka Krek Poplin (Professor, Iowa State University)
- Franz-Benjamin Mocnik (Professor of Space and Place in the Information Sciences, University of Salzburg)
- Martin Raubal (Professor for Geoinformation-Engineering, ETH Zurich, and professor of geography, University of California, Santa Barbara)
- Sabine Timpf (Professor of Geography, University of Augsburg)

Further Ph.D. students of the recent years include:

- Farid Karimipour: A Formal Approach to Implement Dimension Independent Spatial Analyses
- Rizwan Bulbul: AHD: Alternate Hierarchical Decomposition Towards LoD Based Dimension Independent Geometric Modeling
- Paul Weiser: A Pragmatic Communication Model for Way-finding Instructions

Frank guided through habilitation:

- Werner Kuhn (Professor of Geographic Information Science, University of California, Santa Barbara)
- Stephan Winter (Professor of Geomatics, University of Melbourne)
- Takeshi Shirabe (Lecturer of Geoinformation, Royal Institute of Technology, Stockholm)

== Services ==
Andrew Frank was one of the initial team to bring together the winning proposal for the 1988 award to the National Center for Geographic Information and Analysis, under the lead of David S. Simonnet and together with Mike Goodchild, Ross McKinnon, David M. Mark and others. He served as Associate Director of the National Center for Geographic Information and Analysis and lead the operations at the University of Maine.

In 1992 he organized the Conference on Spatial Information Theory in Pisa, known as COSIT 0 and then the first COSIT in 1993 on the Island of Elba. This conference has been continued as a biannual meeting with proceedings published by Springer in LNCS.

At the Vienna University of Technology he served as head of the institute for Geoinformation till it merged into the new department of Geodesy and Geoinformation. He was deputy to the chair of the senate of the Vienna University of Technology from 2013 till 2016.

He served on the editorial board of several Journals in his field:

- IJGIS International Journal of Geographical Information Science
- JOSIS Journal of Spatial Information Science
- Spatial Cognition & Computation

== Honors ==
- Commander's Cross II-nd class (Großes Silbernes Ehrenzeichen) awarded by the President of the Republic of Austria, 2004
- Honorary Doctor of Science, University of Debrecen, 2008.
- Waldo Tobler Distinguished Lecture in GIScience 2012
- Festschrift on occasion of his 60th birthday
- Special section in honor of Andrew U. Frank in International Journal of Geographical Information Science, edited by Stephan Winter, Max Egenhofer, Werner Kuhn (scientist) and Martin Raubal
