= Stewart Fotheringham =

British-American geographer

- Born: Alexander Stewart Fotheringham; 2 February 1954 (age 72); Yorkshire, England
- Citizenship: United Kingdom, US
- Education: University of Aberdeen; McMaster University
- Scientific career
- Workplaces: University at Buffalo; University of Newcastle; National University of Ireland, Maynooth; University of St Andrews; Florida State University
- Thesis: Spatial Structure, Spatial Interaction, and Distance-Decay Parameters (1980)
- Doctoral advisor: Michael J. Webber

Alexander Stewart Fotheringham (born February 2, 1954) is a British-American geographer known for his contributions to quantitative geography, geographic information science (GIScience), and spatial analysis. He holds a Ph.D. in geography from McMaster University and is professor of geography at Florida State University. He has contributed to the literature surrounding spatial analysis and spatial statistics, particularly in the development of geographically weighted regression (GWR) and multiscale geographically weighted regression (MGWR).

== Education ==
Fotheringham received a BSc in geography from the University of Aberdeen in 1976. He received an M.A. in 1978 and Ph.D. in 1980, both in geography from McMaster University. His research focuses on developing and applying spatial statistics, mathematical, and computational methods within the discipline of quantitative geography. He has worked both on the theoretical and applied side of quantitative geography. His applied research interests include crime, public health, and human migration.

== Career ==
=== University positions ===
After obtaining his Ph.D. in 1980, he worked as a professor at University at Buffalo, becoming a full professor in 1988. From 1991 to 1992, he held the position of professor of quantitative geography at the University of Newcastle. From 1993 to 1994, Fotheringham worked as an assistant chair in the Department of Geography at the State University of New York.

In 1994, he returned to the University of Newcastle as a professor of quantitative geography and the director of the North-East Regional Research Laboratory. He remained in this position until 2004. Fotheringham became a visiting research fellow at the University of Leeds until 2006. Simultaneously, from 2004 to 2011, he assumed the SFI research professor and director at the National University of Ireland, Maynooth.

Between 2011 and 2014, Fotheringham served as the director of the Centre for GeoInformatics and was a professor of quantitative geography at the University of St Andrews. In 2014, Fotheringham began his tenure as a professor of computational spatial science at Arizona State University. In 2024, Fotheringham began his tenure as a professor of geography at Florida State University.

Fotheringham published more than 200 peer-reviewed journal articles and book chapters during his career.

=== Professional affiliations ===
From 1995 to 1998, Fotheringham was elected as the chair of the Quantitative Methods Study Group of the Royal Geographical Society. In 2009, he was appointed as Ireland's representative on the Governance Committee of the EU Joint Planning Initiative on Urban Europe, giving him an active involvement in shaping urban planning initiatives.

In 2014, Fotheringham was selected as a member of the National Academy of Sciences’ Mapping Science Committee. This committee seeks to organize research and inform on methods to use spatial data ethically to inform policy and benefit society.

== Research ==
=== Geographically Weighted Regression ===
Fotheringham contributed to GIScience and spatial statistics with his work in developing Geographically Weighted Regression (GWR). GWR was first developed as a statistical technique in the 1990s by Fotheringham, Chris Brundson, and Martin Charloton. Fotheringham has continued to be involved in researching expanding upon GWR, and its applications, in the years since.

GWR is designed to address the limitations of traditional global regression models, such as Ordinary Least Squares (OLS), which assume that relationships between variables are global; that is, constant across space. In GWR, regression coefficients (parameters) are estimated locally for each geographic location or point, allowing for the modeling of spatial heterogeneity. Geographically Weighted Regression is a cornerstone of GIS and spatial analysis, and is built into ArcGIS, as a package for the R (programming language), and as a plugin for QGIS.

=== Geographical and Temporal Weighted Regression ===
Time is recognized as significant to spatial analysis, with a substantial amount of literature within the discipline of time geography. However, incorporating both space and time is a significant challenge for researchers. Fotheringham addressed this problem in his 2015 paper titled "Geographical and Temporal Weighted Regression (GTWR)." GTWR builds upon GWR by incorporating the dimension of time into the analysis. This is accomplished by deriving both spatial and temporal bandwidths and using them to construct a weighted matrix. GTWR is available as packages in R, such as GWmodelS.

=== Multiscale Geographically Weighted Regression ===
Multiscale Geographically Weighted Regression (MGWR) builds upon GWR by allowing for the comparison of variables at different spatial scales| This is accomplished by allowing for different neighborhood bandwidths for each variable. MGWR is available both within ArcGIS and as Python scripts published by a team of researchers including Fotheringham. Fortheringham spoke at UCGIS on applying MGWR in a webinar titled Measuring the "Unmeasurable: Models of Geographical Context."

== Awards and honors ==
- Member, National Academy of Sciences
- Fellow, American Association of Geographers, 2023
- Distinguished Scholarship Honors, American Association of Geographers, 2019
- Outstanding Achievement Award, GEOIDE Network Centre of Excellence, 2000
- The Warren G. Nystrom Award, Association of American Geographers, 1981

== Selected publications ==
- Haynes, Kingsley E.; Fotheringham, A. Stewart (1985). "Gravity and Spatial Interaction Models". 1985. Scientific Geography. SAGE Publishing.
- Fotheringham, Alexander Stewart; Knudsen, Daniel C. (1987). Goodness-of-Fit Statistics (PDF). Geo Books. ISBN 0-86094-222-8.
- Fotheringham, Stewart; Rogerson, Peter (1994). Spatial Analysis and GIS: Technical Issues in Geographic Information Systems. CRC Press. ISBN 0-7484-0104-0.
- Fotheringham, A. Stewart (1999). Spatial Models and GIS: New and Potential Models (Gisdata). CRC Press. ISBN 978-0748408467.
- Fotheringham, A. Stewart; Brunsdon, Chris; Charlton, Martin (2000). Quantitative Geography: Perspectives on Spatial Data Analysis. Sage Publishing. ISBN 978-0-7619-5948-9.
- Fotheringham, A. Stewart; Brunsdon, Chris; Charlton, Martin (2002). Geographically Weighted Regression: the analysis of spatially varying relationships. John Wiley & Sons. ISBN 0-471-49616-2.
- Wilson, John P.; Fotheringham, A. Stewart (2007). The Handbook of Geographic Information Science. John Wiley & Sons. ISBN 9781405107952.
- Fotheringham, A. Stewart; Rogerson, Peter A. (2008). The SAGE Handbook of Spatial Analysis. SAGE Publishing. ISBN 9781412910828.
- Carswell, James D.; Fotheringham, A. Stewart; McArdle, Gavin (2009). Web and Wireless Geographical Information Systems: 9th International Symposium. Springer Science+Business Media. doi:10.1007/978-3-642-10601-9. ISBN 9783642106002.
- Fotheringham, A. Stewart; Oshan, Taylor M.; Li, Ziqi (2023). Multiscale Geographically Weighted Regression: Theory and Practice. CRC Press. doi:10.1201/9781003435464. ISBN 9781003435464. S2CID 262209577.

== See also ==
- Arthur Getis – American geographer and spatial statistician
- George F. Jenks – American geographer and cartographer
- Michael DeMers – American geographer and fiction writer
- Michael Frank Goodchild – British-American geographer
- National Center for Geographic Information and Analysis
- Technical geography – Study of spatial information
- Waldo Tobler – American geographer
