= Werner Kuhn =

Werner Kuhn may refer to:

- Werner Kuhn (chemist), Swiss physical chemist
- Werner Kuhn (professor)
- Werner Kuhn (politician), German politician
