= National Center for Geographic Information and Analysis =

The National Center for Geographic Information and Analysis (NCGIA) was founded in 1988 and hosted at three member campuses: The University of California, Santa Barbara; the State University of New York at Buffalo; and the University of Maine.

The center was founded after receiving a $5 million grant from the National Science Foundation. Ron Abler—then at NSF—described the rationale for the NCGIA and compared it to corresponding efforts in the UK.

Notable faculty involved with the NCGIA include Michael Goodchild, Michael Batty, David Mark, A. Stewart Fotheringham, Andrew Frank, Helen Couclelis, Keith Clarke, Luc Anselin, Waldo R. Tobler amongst others. David William Rhind and Mike Goodchild compare later US and the UK approach.

The research plan was organized along so-called Research Initiatives, which generally started and ended with "specialist meetings", where interdisciplinary teams discussed pressing research issues. Often a publication followed:

- Initiative 1: Accuracy of spatial databases, led by Michael Goodchild
- Initiative 2: Languages of Spatial Relations, led by David Mark and Andrew U. Frank
- Initiative 3: Multiple Representations, led by Barbara Buttenfield
- Initiative 4: The Use and Value of Geographic Information, led by Harlan Onsrud and Hugh Calkins
- Initiative 5: Architecture of Very Large Spatial Databases, led by Terence Smith and Andrew U. Frank
- Initiative 6: Spatial Decision Support Systems (SDSS), led by Paul Densham and Michael Goodchild
- Initiative 7: Visualizing the Quality of Spatial Information, led by Kate Beard and Barbara Buttenfield
- Initiative 8: Formalizing Cartographic Knowledge, led by Barbara Buttenfield
- Initiative 9: Institutions Sharing Geographic Information, led by Harlan Onsrud and Gerard Rushton
- Initiative 10: Spatio-Temporal Reasoning in GIS, led by Max Egenhofer and Reginald Golledge
- Initiative 12: Integration of Remote Sensing and GIS, led by John Estes, Frank Davis and Jeffrey Star

In 1992 the list of publications resulting from these research initiatives and other efforts of the NCGIA were published in the International Journal of Geographical Information Systems.

The NCGIA produces a Core Curriculum for teaching Geographic Information Systems

== See also ==
- UCSB Center for Spatial Studies
- Geographic information science
- Geographic Information Systems
- University Consortium for Geographic Information Science
