= Giles Martin Foody =

Giles Martin Foody is a professor of geographic information science within the faculty of social sciences at the University of Nottingham, UK.

In 2013, Foody was named Fellow of the Institute of Electrical and Electronics Engineers (IEEE) for contributions to the remote sensing of land cover.

== Current Research ==
Foody's research primarily focuses on remote sensing, informatics and ecology. He has had his work extensively cited by over 26,000 people, with a h-index of 82.

Foody also acts as a PhD supervisor within his current role at the University of Nottingham.
