= John Glennon =

John Glennon may refer to:

- John J. Glennon (1862–1946), American, Roman Catholic Cardinal and Archbishop
- John Glennon (writer and actor) (born 1931), American stage actor, writer, screenwriter, and playwright
- John Alan Glennon (born 1970), American geographer and explorer
