= Werner Kuhn (professor) =

Werner Kuhn is a professor of geographic information science at University of California, Santa Barbara. He served as the director of the UCSB Center for Spatial Studies, and is one of the founding members of the Vespucci Initiative for Advancing Geographic Information Science, organizing annual summer schools and specialist meetings.

== Biography ==
Between 1991 and 1996, Kuhn was an assistant professor in the Department of Geoinformation at the Technical University Vienna in Austria, where he worked in the group of Prof. Andrew U. Frank. Before, Kuhn was a postdoctoral researcher at the US National Center for Geographic Information and Analysis (NCGIA) at the University of Maine, USA. He got his doctorate in 1989 from ETH Zurich, Switzerland in surveying engineering with a thesis on sketch-based geometric modeling, and his Venia Legendi (habilitation) in geographic information science from the Technical University Vienna in 1995.

== Scientific community ==
Kuhn was an elected member of the Council of AGILE (Association of Geographic Information Laboratories in Europe, from 1998 to 2002), the international member of the Research Management Committee of the Canadian GEOIDE network (from 2001 to 2003), the Technical Director Europe of the Open GIS Consortium (from 1998 to 2001), and an Austrian delegate to CEN TC 287 on Geographic Information (from 1992 to 1995). Kuhn is a co-founder of the COSIT conference series. He is a member of several editorial boards of peer-reviewed international journals, such as the Semantic Web Journal (SWJ), Applied Ontology (AO), Spatial Cognition and Computation (SCC), the International Journal of Spatial Data Infrastructures Research (IJSDIR) and the Journal of Spatial Information Science (JOSIS).
