= Behavioral geography =

Approach to human geography that examines human behavior using a disaggregate approach

Behavioral geography is an approach to human geography that examines human behavior by separating it into different parts. In addition, behavioral geography is an ideology/approach in human geography that makes use of the methods and assumptions of behaviorism to determine the cognitive processes involved in an individual's perception of or response and reaction to their environment. Behavioral geographers focus on the cognitive processes underlying spatial reasoning, decision making, and behavior.

Behavioral geography is the branch of human science which deals with the study of cognitive processes with its response to its environment through behaviorism.

== Issues ==
Because of the name it is often assumed to have its roots in behaviorism. While some behavioral geographers clearly have roots in behaviorism due to the emphasis on cognition, most can be seen as cognitively oriented. Indeed, it seems that behaviorism interest is more recent and growing. This is particularly true in the area of human landscaping.

Behavioral geography draws from early behaviorist works such as Tolman's concepts of "cognitive maps". More cognitively oriented, behavioral geographers focus on the cognitive processes underlying spatial reasoning, decision making, and behavior. More behaviorally oriented geographers are materialists and look at the role of basic learning processes and how they influence the landscape patterns or even group identity.

The cognitive processes include environmental perception and cognition, wayfinding, the construction of cognitive maps, place attachment, the development of attitudes about space and place, decisions and behavior based on imperfect knowledge of one's environs, and numerous other topics.

The approach adopted in behavioral geography is closely related to that of psychology, but draws on research findings from a multitude of other disciplines including economics, sociology, anthropology, transportation planning, and many others.

== The Social Construction of Nature ==
Nature is the world which surrounds us, including all life (plants, animals, organisms, humans, etc.) and physical features. Social Construction is the way that human beings process the world around us in our minds. According to Plato's 'Classical Theory of Categorization', humans create categories of what they see through experience and imagination. Social constructionism, therefore, is this characterization that makes language and semantics possible. If these experiences and imageries are not placed into categories, then the human ability to think about it becomes limited.

The social construction of nature looks to question different truths and understandings for how people treat nature, based on when and where someone lives. In academic circles, researchers look at how truths exist (ontology) and how truths are justified (epistemology). Construction is both a process and an outcome, where people's understandings of the word nature can be both literal and metaphorical, such as through giving it a human quality (Mother Nature). It can also be used to discredit science or philosophy.

As a subset of behavioral geography, the social construction of nature also includes environmental ethics and values, which affect how humans treat, and interact with, the natural environment. It incorporates ideas from environmental science, ecology, sociology, geography, biology, theology, philosophy, psychology, politics, economics, and other disciplines, to bring together the social, cultural and environmental dimensions of life. Social constructionism uses a lot of ideas from Western world thinking, but it is also incorporates truths from other world views, such as the Traditional Knowledge of Aboriginal groups, or more specifically ecofeminism and cosmology in India or ubuntu philosophy in Africa, for example. It is also related to postmodernism and the concept of the Anthropocene, that views humans as a force that is redirecting the geological history of Earth, destroying nature.

=== The Role of Linguistics ===
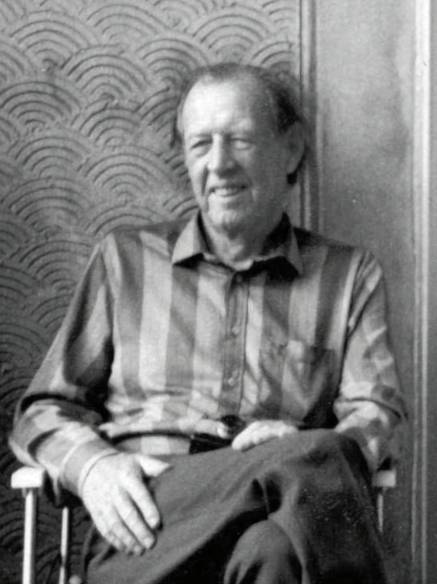
Raymond Williams, author of Keywords: A vocabulary of culture and society (1983).

There are many ways of understanding and interpreting nature. According to Raymond Williams, there are three ways to give meaning to (or define) nature:

1. Nature as a quality, character or process (e.g. human nature)
2. Nature as a force (e.g. weather)
3. Nature as the material world (e.g. the physical environment)

According to Raymond Williams, language plays a role in how we understand, interpret, and give meaning to nature. This is how multiple truths can be valid at the same time.

=== The Role of Mental Maps ===
Humans have the ability to create images of their environments through experiences in their mind. These experiences allow us to create mental maps where we can create memories associated to space. It is a two-way process where the environment provides suggestions for what should be seen, and then the observer gives meaning with those suggestions.

These images have three parts:

1. An identity
2. A pattern
3. A practical or emotional meaning

According to Kevin Lynch, the environmental images (or mental maps) that we make can either be weak or strong, where the process is ongoing and never stops.

=== The Role of Science ===
Science occurs at many dimensions and scales that do not consider culture, but can be motivated by politics, economics and ethics. Scientific knowledge consists of concepts and analysis, and is a way to represent nature.

According to Michel Foucault, a truth does not have to be close to reality for it to be worth something or have power. For Carolyn Merchant, science can only be given power if a truth is interpreted as having worth.

== Schools of Thought ==
Relativism is important in the social construction of nature, as all truths are relative to the perspective they are coming from. There are two schools of thought on how the social construction of nature is relative:

1. Critical Realism (being realistic)
2. Pragmatism (being practical)

Critical realists reject the idea of relativism and rely more on natural sciences. Pragmatists have no set opinion on the matter and rely on social science and ethics, instead.

According to Richard Rorty, relativism is relevant to pragmatism in three ways:

1. Every belief is equally valid
2. There are no criteria for what a truth can be
3. That any truth can be justified by the society it comes from

According to Gilbert White, pragmatism has four main assumptions:

1. That human existence is based on putting labor into the land
2. That the idea of owning anything is a conception
3. That humans learn from their experiences
4. That engagement of the publics is what allows for commitments

Richard Rorty also associated three characteristics to pragmatism:

1. That all theories characterize some form of truth
2. That there is not difference between what can and should be done when it comes to the truth
3. That knowledge is constrained by the conversations we have

Being pragmatic is the more accepted school of thought for social construction being a relative concept.

== Historical Overview ==
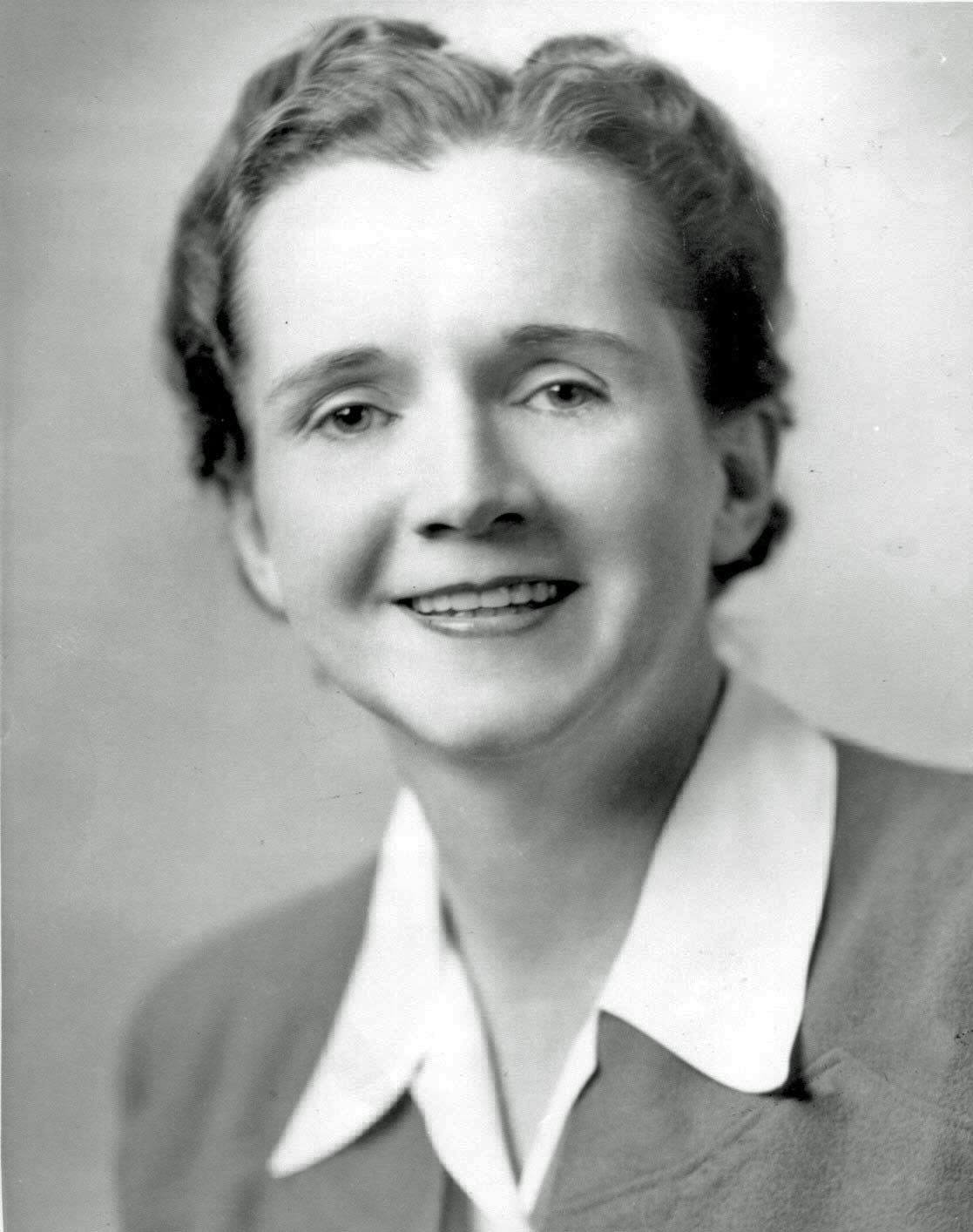
Rachel Carson, author of Silent Spring (1962).

=== Recovery narratives ===
- 1500s: Francis Bacon (that human intervention in nature is needed to gain back the Garden of Eden on Earth)
- 1600s: René Descartes (that the world is a machine we can control)
- 1600s: John Locke (that private property makes humans civilized)
- 1700s: Adam Smith (that capitalism will bring progress)
- Present-day: The Christian narrative and the narrative of the Scientific Revolution have merged to become the 'Recovery Narrative of Western Culture'

=== Transitions in Thought ===
- 1500s-1600s: The belief that man is responsible for environmental problems
- 1700s-1800s: The idea that progress is attained through controlling nature
- Mid-1800s: The realization that humans are having unintended impacts on the environment
- 1800s-1900s: The belief that technology has all the solutions to our problems
- 1920s-1930s: The belief that technology is destroying nature
- 1950s-1960s: The belief that humans risk being annihilated if they do not control technological impacts
- 1960s-1970s: The public awakening of human impacts on the environment with the publication of Rachel Carson's Silent Spring
- 1980s: The belief that no matter the costs, unrestricted growth is needed for progress
- 1987: The spreading of public awareness of impacts with the publication of the Brundtland Commission Report: Our Common Future

== How Nature becomes Socially Constructed ==
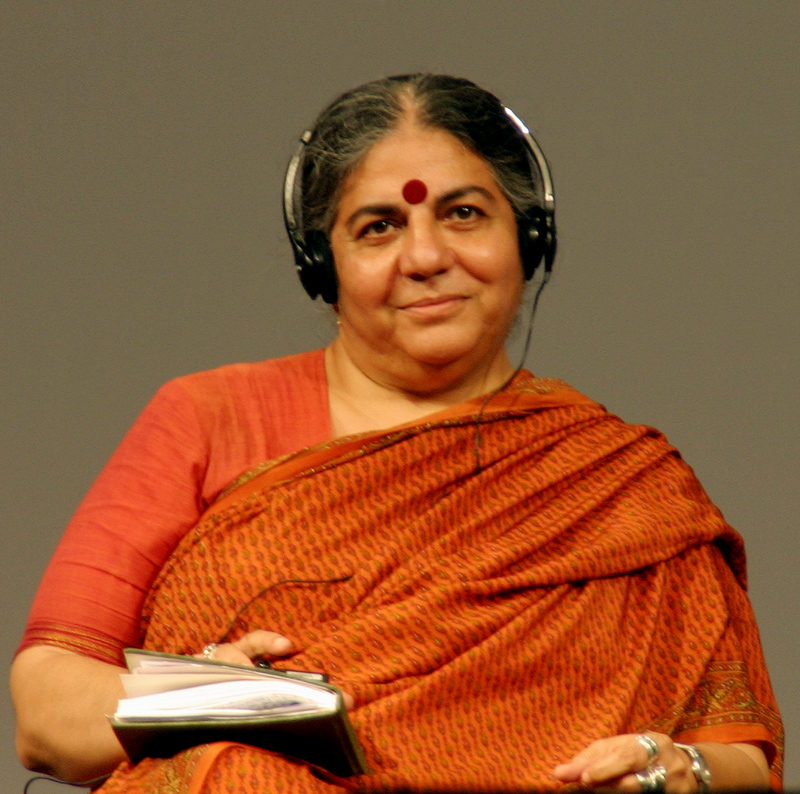
Vandana Shiva, author of Staying Alive: Women, Culture, and Development (1988).

Nature can be socially constructed by both culturally interpreting and physically shaping the environment. This can happen in three ways:

1. Using non-human symbols to represent nature (Totemism)
2. Using non-human animals to relate to nature (Animism)
3. Viewing nature as an 'Other' (Naturalism)

Constructions can also be categorized by giving them meaning through the process of embodiment, which has three components:

1. The 'habitus' (the individual)
2. The practice it originates from (the culture)
3. An associated taxonomic group (i.e. homo sapiens)

No matter how nature becomes socially constructed, though, the process itself is limited by three dimensions:

1. The physical dimension
2. The mental dimension
3. The social dimension

The physical dimension is limited to the human body, where the brain is responsible for creating and selecting thoughts. The mental dimension is used to understand the physical dimension and is limited to human logic. The social dimension needs moral and social order and is used to give meaning to both what is physically present and what is culturally constructed. All three dimensions must be present and linked to be able to socially construct nature.

== Criticism on the Social Construction of Nature ==
The social construction of nature has room for improvement in four main areas:

1. By giving more importance to how realities are culturally constructed through social interactions
2. By acknowledging that all science should be analyzed by the same standard
3. By gaining a better understanding of the role language plays in constructionism
4. By giving more importance to how truths exist and how they are justified, using Actor-Network Theory

== See also ==
- Cognitive geography
