= Michael Frank Goodchild =

British-American geographer

Mike Goodchild
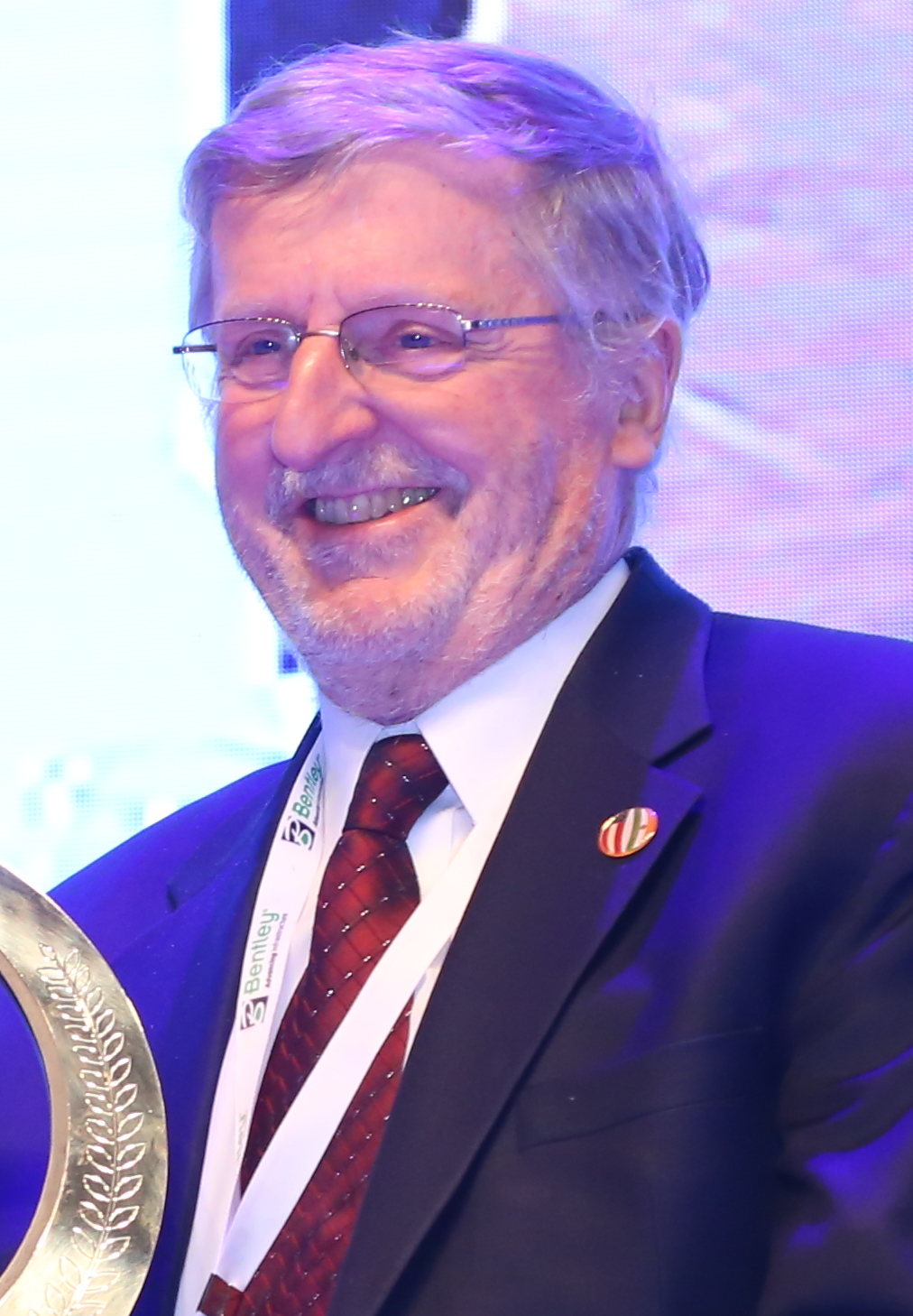
- Michael Frank Goodchild in 2017.
- Born: February 24, 1944 (age 82)
- Education: University of Cambridge (BA); McMaster University (PhD)
- Scientific career
- Institutions: University of Western Ontario; University of California, Santa Barbara; University of Washington; Arizona State University
- Thesis: The Generation of Small Scale Relief Features of Eroded Limestone: A Study of Erosional Scallops (1969)
- Doctoral advisor: Derek C. Ford
- Doctoral students: Alan Glennon

Michael Frank Goodchild (born February 24, 1944) is a British-American geographer. He is an Emeritus Professor of Geography at the University of California, Santa Barbara. After nineteen years at the University of Western Ontario, including three years as chair, he moved to Santa Barbara in 1988, as part of the establishment of the National Center for Geographic Information and Analysis, which he directed for over 20 years. In 2008, he founded the UCSB Center for Spatial Studies.

== Education ==
- B.A., Physics, Downing College, Cambridge, Cambridge, England, 1965
- Ph.D., Geography, McMaster University, Hamilton, Ontario, 1969

== Scholarship ==
His most influential work has involved research on Geographic Information Science (aka GIS). He is widely credited with coining "Volunteered Geographic Information" and is considered the world's foremost expert on the topic.

== Caves and karst ==
As a doctoral student at McMaster University, Goodchild rediscovered Castleguard Cave in Banff National Park 20 kilometers long, the longest cave in Canada). His student Alan Glennon discovered an entrance and made significant discoveries to the Martin Ridge Cave System, Kentucky (51.8 kilometers long). Goodchild's dissertation advisor, Derek C. Ford, is a Canadian geomorphologist and karst scientist.

== Honors ==
- Fellow of the British Academy, 2010-
- Foreign Member of the Royal Society, 2010-
- Researcher of the Year, University Consortium for Geographic Information Science, 2010;
- Prix Vautrin Lud, St Dié-des-Vosges, France, 2007;
- Member, American Academy of Arts and Sciences, 2006–;
- Honorary Doctor of Laws, Ryerson University, 2004;
- Honorary Doctor of Science, McMaster University, 2004;
- Professor, Wuhan University, 2003–;
- Faculty Research Lecturer, University of California, Santa Barbara, 2003;
- Founder's Medal, Royal Geographical Society, 2003;
- Educator of the Year, University Consortium for Geographic Information Science, 2002;
- Foreign Fellow, Royal Society of Canada, 2002–;
- Member, National Academy of Sciences, 2002–;
- National Associate of the National Academies, 2001–;
- Lifetime Achievement Award, Environmental Systems Research Institute (ESRI), 2001;
- Honorary Doctor of Science, Keele University, 2001;
- Award of Distinction for Exceptional Scholarly Contributions to Cartography, Canadian Cartographic Association, 1999;
- Honorary Doctor of Science, Université Laval, 1999.

== See also ==
- Alexander Stewart Fotheringham – British-American geographer
- Arthur Getis – American geographer and spatial statistician
- Concepts and Techniques in Modern Geography – Series of geography texts, 1975–1996
- George F. Jenks – American geographer and cartographer
- Michael DeMers – American geographer and fiction writer
- Technical geography – Study of spatial information
  - Quantitative geography – Subfield of geographic methods
  - Qualitative geography – Subfield of geographic methods
- Waldo Tobler – American geographer
