= Brian Lees (geographer) =

Australian geographer

Brian Lees (born Scotland, 1944; Educated Royal High School, Edinburgh) is an Australian geographer and was the editor-in-chief of the International Journal of Geographical Information Science.

Lees started off as Regional Editor for the Western Pacific in 1997 and took over as Editor-in-Chief in 2007. He handed over to Professor May Yuan in January 2017. He is an emeritus professor at the University of New South Wales, School of Physical, Environmental & Mathematical Sciences, where he was appointed professor of geography in February 2006.

== Career ==
Lees has been an RAF officer (Flight Navigator) and served in the Middle East, Europe (Operation Hallmark: a sensitive intelligence operation in which Pembrokes were fitted with high-powered reconnaissance cameras to acquire imagery of Soviet and East German military installations and airfields below tightly controlled air corridors), and Africa. After his military service, he obtained a commercial pilot license and a flight navigator license. His career in geography began with flying as a navigator for ADASTRA AERIAL SURVEYS, engaged in mineral exploration and mapping projects. Beginning in 1977 he co-partnered in joint ventures and became a director of two small companies engaged in exploration and exploration manager of a third company. He received his PhD in 1984 from the University of Sydney and then joined the Australian National University in 1985. Currently, his main research interests are global change, predictive mapping of land cover, and land degradation. Lees is also a special invited professor at the Institute of Soil and Water Conservation (Chinese Academy of Sciences). Additionally, he is a commissioner and past chairman of the International Geographical Union Commission on Geographical Information Science.

== Awards ==
- The Australasian Institute of Spatial Information Science and Technology (AISIST) Prize in recognition of a “substantial contribution to the study of the science of Urban and Regional Information Systems”, 1997.
- The Land Victoria Fellowship, University of Melbourne, 1999.
- The Eminent Individual Award; Australasian Urban and Regional Information Systems Association (AURISA) 1999.
- Fellow of the Australasian Urban and Regional Information Systems Association (AURISA) 2003.
- Fellow of the Spatial Sciences Institute (SSI) 2004.
- Fellow of the Institute of Australian Geographers 2009.

== Published works ==
Lees is a co-author of Advances in Digital Terrain Analysis: Lecture Notes in Geoinformation and Cartography, published in 2008 by Springer Science+Business Media, and has authored and co-authored a number of papers and book chapters in peer-reviewed scientific journals.

And with Shawn Laffan, "The lande of Java on the Jean Rotze Mappa Mundi", The Globe, no. 85, 2019.
