= UCSB Center for Spatial Studies and Data Science =

US research center

Coordinates: 34°24′57.8″N 119°50′40.8″W

UCSB Center for Spatial Studies
- Formation: 2007
- Headquarters: Santa Barbara, California
- Director: Trisalyn Nelson
- Website: spatial.ucsb.edu

The Center for Spatial Studies and Data Science, founded as The Center for Spatial Studies in 2007, is a research center at the University of California, Santa Barbara centered on geographic data science.

== History ==
The center was a spinoff of the National Center for Geographic Information and Analysis (NCGIA), also at UC Santa Barbara. It was founded as The Center for Spatial Studies in 2007, drawing on research by the National Center for Geographic Information and Analysis and the Center for Spatially Integrated Social Science, which had been founded in 2000. Founder Michael Goodchild was the director from 2007 until mid-2012. He was followed by Mary Hegarty for a year, then Werner Kuhn in 2013 until 2020. Krzysztof Janowicz was director from 2020 to 2023. In 2023, it rebranded as the Center for Spatial Studies and Data Science. Since 2024, Trisalyn Nelson has been director of the center.

== Mission and programs ==
The mission of the Center for Spatial Studies and Data Science is to serve the UC Santa Barbara campus, the local community, and society by accelerating scientific discovery, education, and access to actionable solutions. The Center hosts speakers, workshops, and visiting researchers as well as the annual Specialist Meeting that brings global experts together on emerging topics in spatial data science.

Community outreach efforts include the Earth + Humans podcast about the challenges brought on by human’s interactions with the environment, as well as the Community GIS Initiative, which aims to increase access to GIS solutions by engaging with people have GIS skills.

== Research ==
It focuses on spatial thinking across domains, spatial intelligence, geoinformatics, geographic information science, and geographic information systems. The Center consists of core researchers engaged in center management and initiatives, affiliate researchers across UC Santa Barbara, a Trainee Network of post-docs, graduate students, and undergraduate students, support staff, and external partners.

== List of directors ==
- Michael Goodchild (2008-2012)
- Werner Kuhn (2012-2020)
- Krzysztof Janowicz (2020-2022)
- Trisalyn Nelson (2022-Present)
