= GIScience & Remote Sensing =

- Discipline: Geography, Remote sensing
- Language: English

Publication details
- Former name(s): Mapping Sciences and Remote Sensing (0749-3878); Geodesy, Mapping and Photogrammetry (0361-4433)
- Publisher: Routledge

Standard abbreviations
- ISO 4: GISci. Remote Sens.

Indexing
- ISSN: 1548-1603 (print); 1943-7226 (web)

GIScience & Remote Sensing (formerly Mapping Sciences and Remote Sensing and Geodesy, Mapping and Photogrammetry) is an academic journal published by Routledge about geographic information science and remote sensing. Routledge acquired GIScience & Remote Sensing from former publisher Bellwether Publishing in 2013. Its 2018 impact factor is 3.588
