= Whigpistle Cave System =

Cave system in the United States

Coordinates: 37.1196°N 86.1279°W

The Whigpistle Cave System is a large cave near Mammoth Cave, in the U.S. state of Kentucky. The system, composed of the interconnected Whigpistle, Martin Ridge, and Jackpot Caves, has been mapped to over 71 kilometers (44 mi), and is currently the United States' twelfth-longest cave.

== Discovery ==
The original entrance to the system, Whigpistle Cave, was discovered by Rick Schwartz in 1976. Mapping was initiated by the National Park Service under the supervision of park hydrologist Jim Quinlan in an effort to better understand the hydrology of Mammoth Cave's watershed.

== Significance ==
Surveyed so far to over 71 kilometers (44 mi), the Whigpistle Cave System is ranked as third-longest in Kentucky, twelfth-longest in the United States, and 47th-longest in the world. The cave also contains what is likely the largest cave chamber in Kentucky, the Big Womb. The Big Womb measures 240 meters (790 feet) long, 40 meters (130 feet) wide, and 13 meters (43 feet) high. The cave possesses an intimate hydrologic connection with nearby Mammoth Cave. Groundwater dye tracing has shown that water flowing from Mammoth Cave's Hawkins River emerges downstream at a river within Martin Ridge Cave. The unexplored section between Mammoth Cave and the Whigpistle Cave System may be underwater and could require cave diving to determine whether a traversable physical connection is possible.

== Connections ==
In 1994, explorers from the James Cave Project discovered Jackpot Cave to the east of the Whigpistle entrance. Their efforts mapped over three miles (4.8 km) of new cave.

In 1996, Western Kentucky University graduate students Alan Glennon and Jon Jasper discovered a new entrance and eight miles (13 km) of cave passage. Their exploration revealed connections to Jackpot in June 1996 and Whigpistle in August 1996.

== Current exploration ==
Efforts continue to explore and map the cave. The Whigpistle Cave System is separated from Mammoth Cave by a deep valley, though a human connection may be possible at the caves' lowest elevation passageways. Currently, at least a one-kilometer (3,300-foot) gap exists between the two caves' closest known reaches.

== See also ==
- List of caves in the United States
- List of longest caves in the United States
