= International Journal of Geographical Information Science =

- Discipline: Geographical information science
- Language: English
- Edited by: May Yuan

Publication details
- Former name: International Journal of Geographical Information Systems
- History: 1997–present
- Publisher: Taylor & Francis
- Frequency: Monthly
- Impact factor: 5.9 (2025)

Standard abbreviations
- ISO 4: Int. J. Geogr. Inf. Sci.

Indexing
- CODEN: IGISFR
- ISSN: 1365-8816 (print); 1362-3087 (web)
- LCCN: 97648219
- OCLC no.: 38277271

Links
- Journal homepage; Online access; Online archive

International Journal of Geographical Information Science is a monthly peer-reviewed scientific journal published by Taylor & Francis. The editor-in-chief is May Yuan (University of Texas at Dallas), who succeeded Brian Lees (University of New South Wales) in January 2017.

The journal covers original research in fundamental and computational geographic information science, including applying geographical information science to monitoring, prediction, and decision making, as well as natural resources, social systems, computer science, cartography, surveying, geography, and engineering, in both developed and developing countries.

== Abstracting and indexing ==
The journal is abstracted and indexed in:

- ACM Guide to Computing Literature
- CompuMath Citation Index
- Current Contents/Social and Behavioral Sciences
- EBSCO databases
- ERIC
- GEOBASE
- Inspec
- Science Citation Index
- Social Sciences Citation Index
- Zetoc

According to the Journal Citation Reports, the journal has a 2025 impact factor of 5.9.
