= International Journal of Applied Earth Observation and Geoinformation =

- Discipline: Geography, Remote sensing
- Language: English

Publication details
- Publisher: Elsevier

Standard abbreviations
- ISO 4: Int. J. Appl. Earth Obs. Geoinf.

Indexing
- ISSN: 1569-8432 (print); 1872-826X (web)

The International Journal of Applied Earth Observation and Geoinformation is an academic journal published by Elsevier about remote sensing and geographic information. Its editor-in-chief is F. Van der Meer and its 2019 impact factor is 4.650.
