= Castleguard Cave =

Limestone cave in Alberta, Canada

Coordinates: 52°04′38″N 117°12′48″W

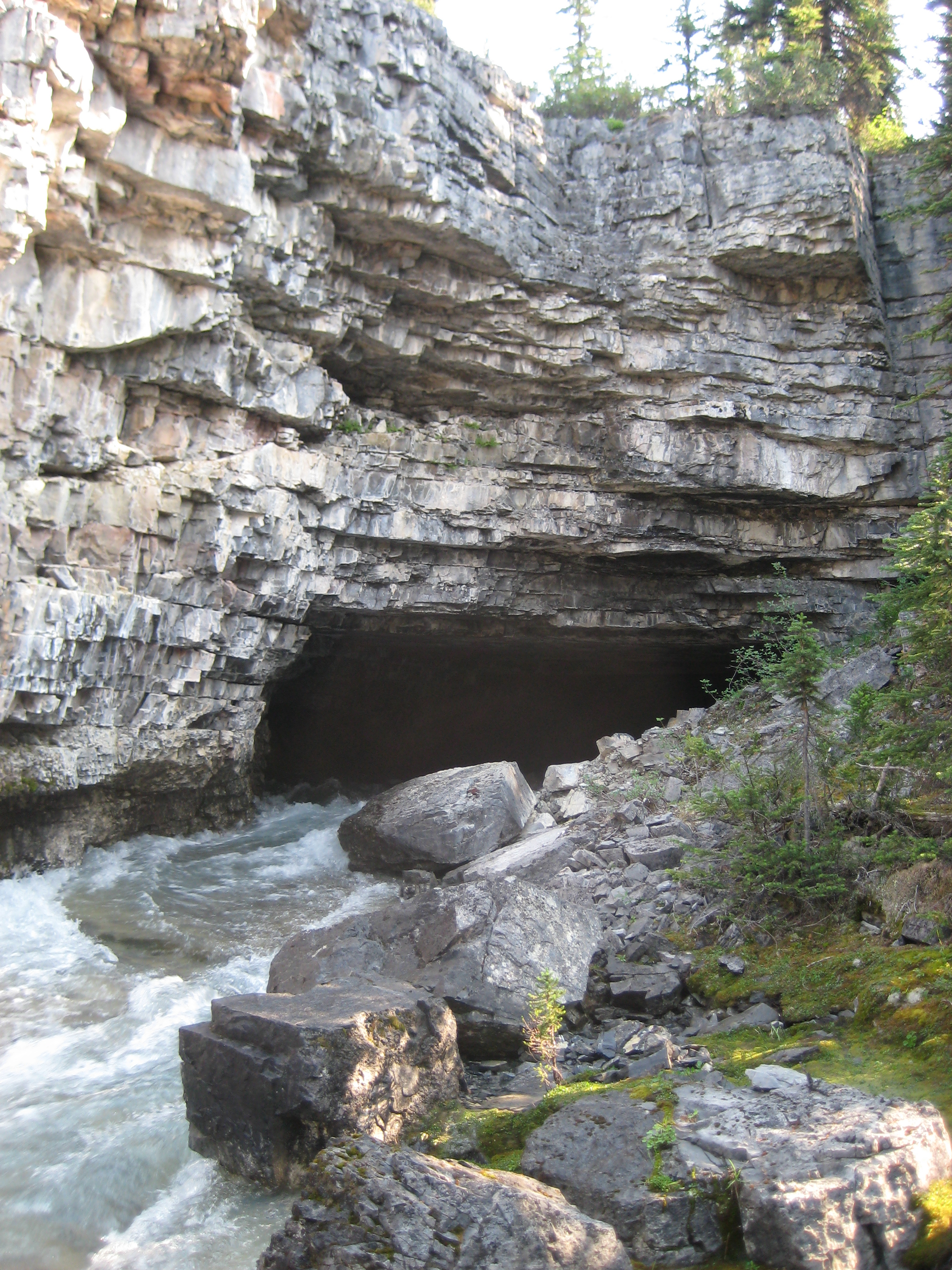
The entrance to Castleguard Cave in summer. Note the substantial amount of water coming from the cave mouth.

Castleguard Cave is a limestone cave located at the north end of Banff National Park in the Rocky Mountains of Alberta, Canada. With 21,311 metres (69,918 ft) of surveyed passages (as of 2024), it is Canada's second longest cave, and its tenth deepest at 388 metres (1,273 ft). Castleguard Cave ascends gently from its entrance and terminates beneath the Columbia Icefield.

== General information ==
Castleguard Cave is modest in size compared to other great caves of the world, but nevertheless is well known amongst cavers and speleologists internationally. It is the subject of a film and a coffee-table book, and is mentioned in most cave reference books in print.

This attention is due in part to its magnificent, remote mountain setting. Its location within a protected area in a national park prohibits motorized ground access, and the risk of flooding in its entrance has limited most explorations to mid or late winter, so cavers must access it via a 20 km (12 mi) ski with towed sleds, or by helicopter. This feeling of remoteness is compounded by the cave's linear layout and its single entrance. The classic trip, from the entrance to the Ice Plug by the shortest route, traverses 9 km (6 mi) of cave passage. Cavers often are underground for four or five days, staying at two underground camps.

Most northern caves are not well decorated with cave formations, but Castleguard Cave has some sections with good flowstone and stalactites, and is known for its nest of exceedingly rare cubic cave pearls and extensive displays of flagged soda straws. The back passages of Castleguard Cave are the only ones in the world that end in plugs of glacial ice pushed into the cave from the sole of a surface icefield.

It has been suggested that the cave was a refuge for the isopods and other life found in its pools during periods of glaciation. One unique species, the amphipod Stygobromus canadensis, was identified in 1977.

== Cave setting and form ==
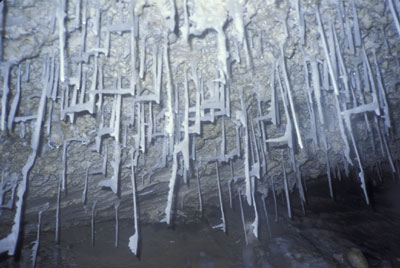
Flagged soda straws, Castleguard Cave.

Castleguard Cave lies within the Cathedral Formation limestone, except the headward complex which is in the overlying Stephen Formation shaley limestones. Their gently-dipping bedding (about 5 degrees) is reflected in the near-horizontal aspect of the cave. Although the entrance and headwater sections are more complex, the central portion of the cave consists of a single main passage alternating between long sections of vadose (rift or canyon) passages linked by shorter phreatic (tubular) sections. Much of the cave is dry, excepting the entrance series which floods unpredictably in summer.

Castleguard Cave has had a long genesis. The accessible, explored portion of the cave, sometimes referred to as Castleguard 1, is a long-abandoned drain. Studies of pollen found within cave sediments suggest that these cave passages were fully developed and dewatered at least 1M years before present. It is postulated that an underlying cave, Castleguard 2, carries the present-day glacial drainage, resurging at Big Springs. A third cave system, Castleguard 3, collects surface melt from Castleguard Meadows at right-angles to the main cave, joining it somewhere prior to the Big Springs resurgence. Castleguard 3 has been proven by dye tracing and has not been entered to any significant degree by cavers.

== Access ==
Castleguard Cave lies within Banff National Park and is under the jurisdiction of Parks Canada. The entrance has been gated and access has been restricted since the 1970s. Local cavers have worked with Parks Canada to ensure that permits are available to qualified parties upon application.

== Discovery and exploration ==
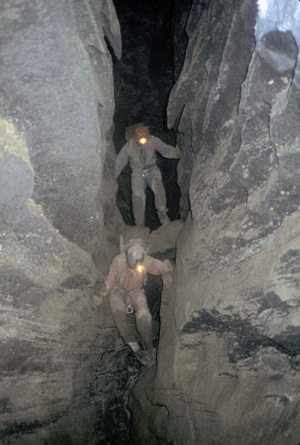
Second Fissure, Castleguard Cave.

Undoubtedly the cave was known to natives throughout prehistory, but the first recorded visit was by Cecil Smith, an outfitter rounding up stray horses during a guided trip to Castleguard Meadows in 1921. Smith's client happened to be the head of the U.S. Geological Survey, and three years later the cave entrance was revisited and photographed as part of an article on the Columbia Icefield for National Geographic magazine.

Sporadic local visitations likely continued for many years, but the first formal investigations were in the summer of 1967 by members of the Karst Research Group (from McMaster University in Hamilton, Ontario) led by Dr. Derek Ford, following up on a tip from a local outdoorsman. KRG teams penetrated past the cave's first obstacle, an 8m drop, and explored the main trunk passage. After Peter Thompson and Mike Boon were trapped in the cave by sudden flooding near the entrance, explorations were limited to mid or late winter, with attendant difficulties. The Ice Plug, the 'end' of the cave, was discovered by Mike Boon during a controversial solo trip in the winter of 1970. Soon thereafter cavers helped produce The Longest Cave, a National Film Board production, during which some side passages were explored. The first woman to the Ice Plug at the end of Castleguard Cave was Jane Mulkewich.

Explorations slowed somewhat following national park access restrictions, but picked up again in the 1980s when most of the major side passages (including Boulevard du Quebec and extensions to Thompson's Terror) were explored by Canadian and international teams, bringing Castleguard Cave to a known length that exceeds 20 kilometres (12 mi). Such explorations continue today, but with diminishing returns as the major leads have all been checked.

In 2005, a Norwegian group spent three days bolt-climbing the '200-foot aven', a vertical shaft going straight up from the cave level about halfway in, slightly inside of the site known as 'Camp One'. The measured height was 68 metres (223 ft) to the floor of the top chamber. Somewhat to the disappointment of the explorers the chamber narrows to an impassable crack; however, in caving first impressions are not always authoritative and there is still some hope of further penetration in that area.

A Canadian-supported team from the UK dived the sump at Boon's Blunder in 2009 and 2010, reaching substantial dry phreatic passage after a dive of 845 metres (2,772 ft). Exploration of these passages is expected in the future.

Concurrent with exploration was the survey, or mapping, of the cave. Data was held at a number of sources, and doubts about completeness or consistency of standards led to a remapping project coordinated by Steve Worthington and supported by cave radio location work by Ian Drummond. But the prospects of hand-drafting a map seven metres long were daunting, and production was delayed until the arrival of computer technology. After further work on verification, addition of passage detail and survey of various unchecked leads, a final map in digital format was produced late in 2005 and is updated whenever new mapping occurs.

== Videos ==
Park Canada/NFB movie

https://www.youtube.com/watch?v=7Lpa7I1SNu0&t=3s

1973 Derek Ford, Sid Perou, Haverand Productions, National Film Board of Canada and Parks Canada

Das Caver

https://www.youtube.com/watch?v=WTUplwEjRjM (English)

https://www.youtube.com/watch?v=UtXMecC7yCY (French)

Richard Patenaude

https://www.youtube.com/watch?v=905S37j8fvQ (Amateur exploration expedition)

Marek Vokac (2013)

https://www.youtube.com/watch?v=905S37j8fvQ (Amateur exploration expedition)

== Gallery ==
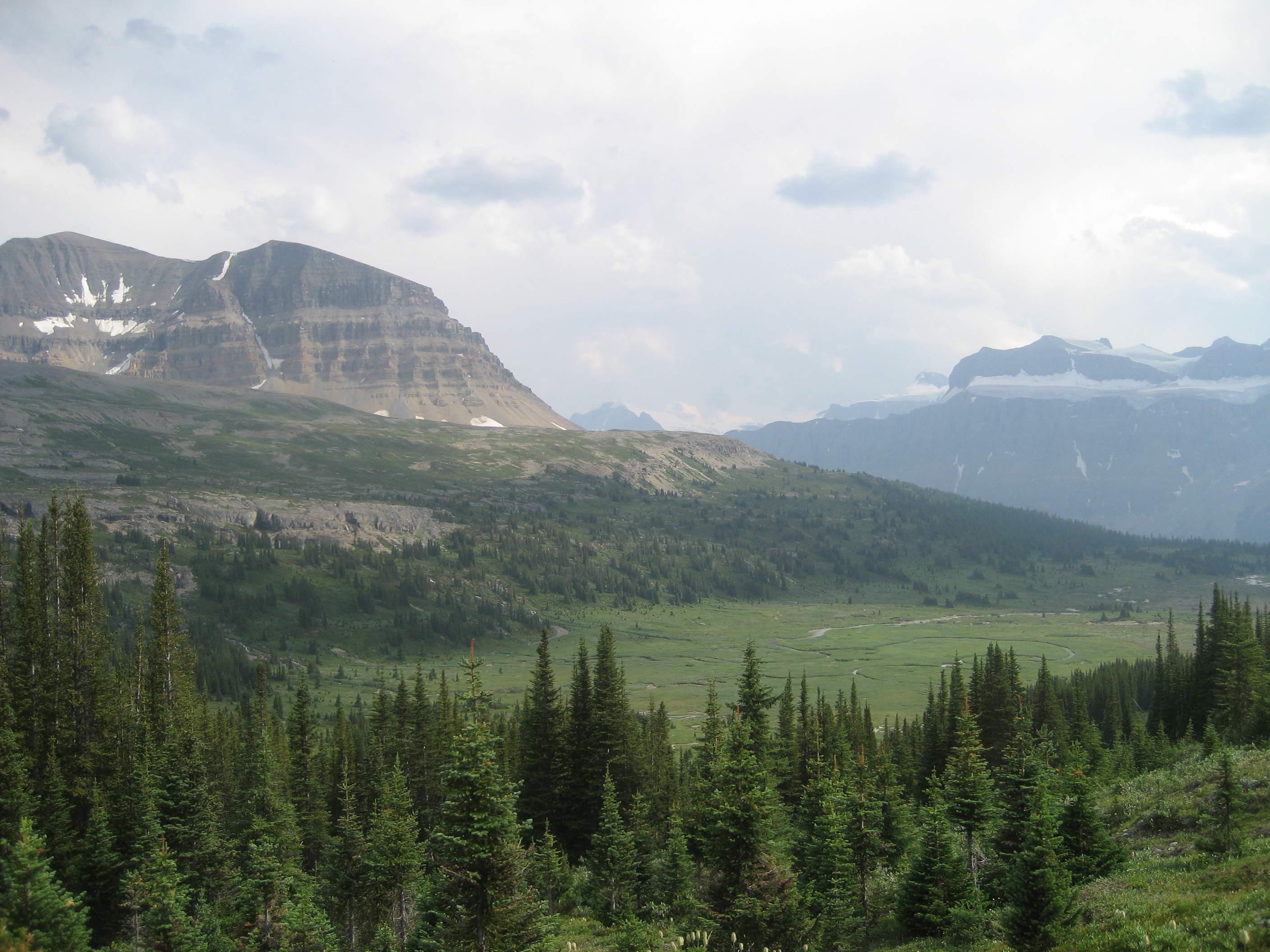
Looking down over Castleguard meadows.

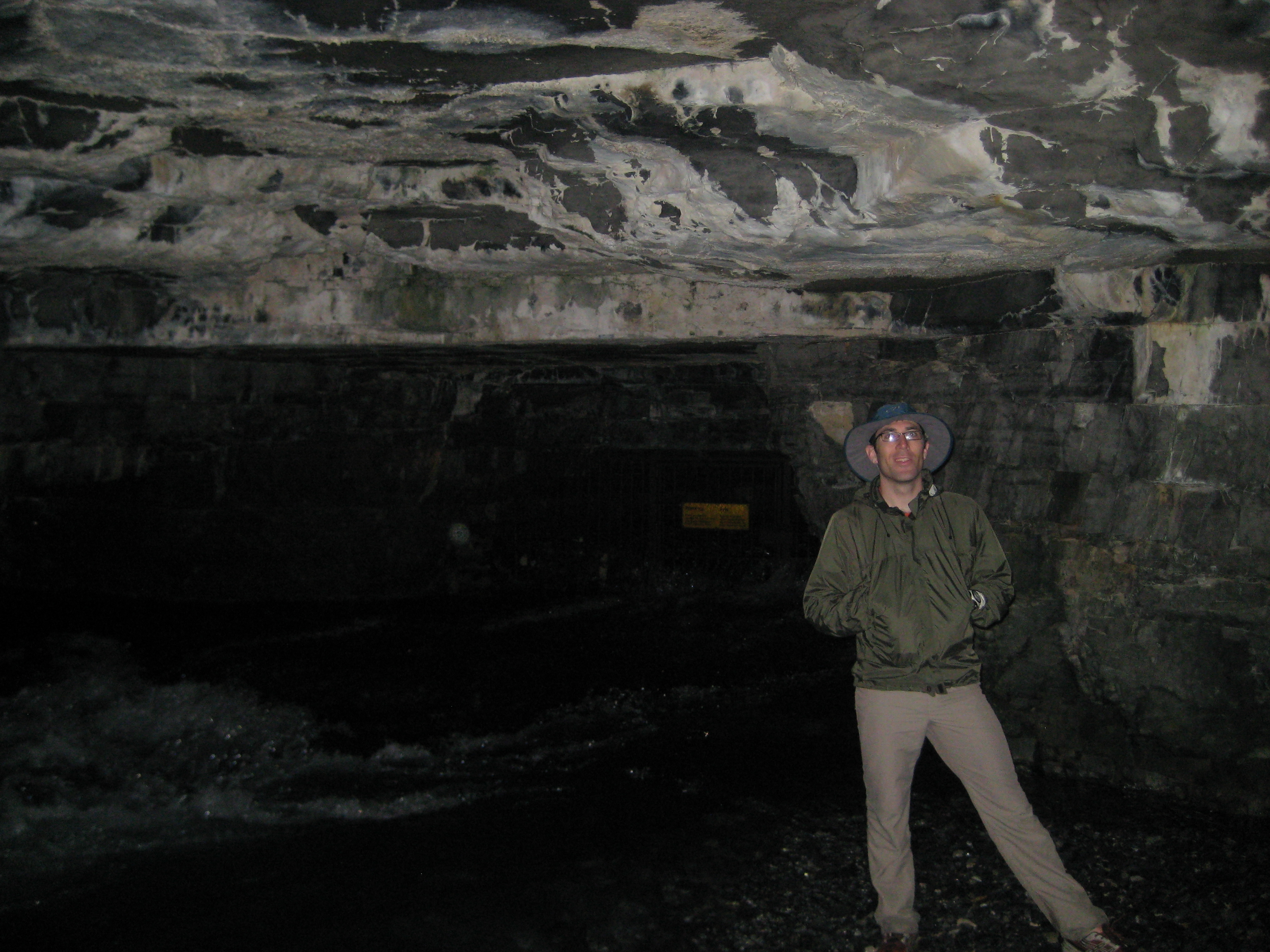
A gate blocks unauthorized entry just within the cave opening.
