= David Mark (scientist) =

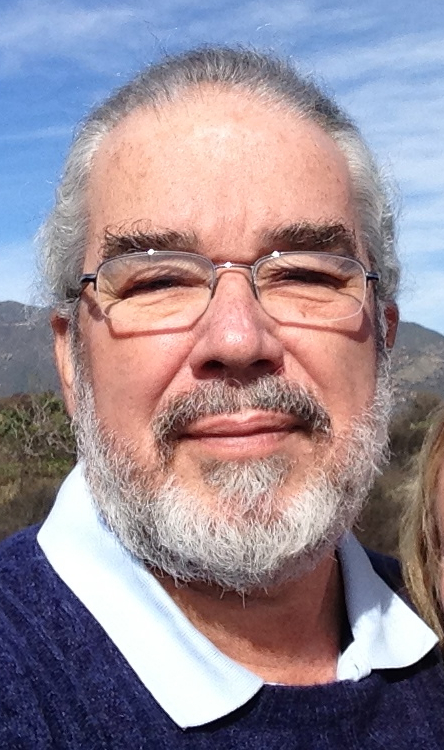
- David Mark, December 2012
- Born: October 7, 1947
- Died: September 24, 2022 (aged 74)
- Education: University of British Columbia; Simon Fraser University
- Scientific career
- Fields: GIScience; Spatial cognition Ontology
- Workplaces: Simon Fraser University; University of Ottawa; University of British Columbia; University of Western Ontario; University at Buffalo
- Thesis: (1977)
- Doctoral advisor: Thomas K. Poiker
- Website: www.geog.buffalo.edu/~dmark/

David Mark (October 7, 1947 – September 24, 2022) was a SUNY Distinguished Professor in the Department of Geography at the University at Buffalo, USA. He made several contributions to research and education in Geographic Information Science (GIScience), most recently in human spatial cognition and language.

== Education and Professional career ==
Mark worked at three universities between 1976 and 1978: Simon Fraser University, the University of Ottawa, and the University of British Columbia. He was an assistant professor of geography at the University of Western Ontario from 1978 to 1981. In 1981, he moved to the Department of Geography at the University at Buffalo as an assistant professor. Mark was promoted to associate professor in 1983 and to the rank of Professor in 1987. In 2007, he was conferred with the title of SUNY Distinguished Professor.

== Awards ==
YEAR	NOTABLE AWARDS
2004	UCGIS Researcher of the Year
2007	SUNY Distinguished Professor
2009	UCGIS Educator of the Year
2010	UCGIS Elected Fellow
2013	Robert T. Aangeenbrug Distinguished Career Award (AAG GIS Specialty Group)
2016	Outstanding Alumni Award - Academic Achievement (Simon Fraser University)
2016	Waldo-Tobler GIScience Prize (Austrian Academy of Sciences)

== Contributions to Geographic Information Science ==
Mark's specialty was in the field of Geographic Information Science (GIScience). He authored or coauthored more than 230 scholarly papers which have been cited over 10,000 times. He researched cognitive and linguistic foundations of how geographic information is conceptualized and used. In the 1970s and 1980s, he pioneered methods for representing topography for digital computers, including the earliest methods for the Triangular Irregular Network data model. He is credited for a popular water flow routing GIS algorithm, which specifies how to eliminate spurious pits from digital elevation models. In 1990, David Mark organized with Andrew U. Frank the NATO Advanced Study Institute in Las Navas del Marquez (Spain). This meeting was the origin of research in spatial cognition and linguistics for the field of GIScience. With Barry Smith and others, Mark co-authored several widely cited papers on geographic categorization, geographic reasoning, and the ontology of geographic features. In the early 2000s, Mark and Andrew Turk created the area of study called "Ethnophysiography" to study how language and culture are related to people's naïve conceptualizations of the physical landscape. Until his death, he continued to work on most of these topics, with special focus on establishing a foundational ontology of the landscape.
