= Vauthier =

Vauthier is a surname. Notable people with the surname include:

- Alexandre Vauthier (born 1971), French fashion designer
- Antoine-Charles Vauthier (1790–1879), French botanist
- Arsène Marie Paul Vauthier (1885–1979), major general in the French Army
- Eugène Vauthier (1843–1910), French opera singer
- Jean Vauthier (1910–1992), French playwright
- Louis Constant Vauthier (1887–1963), Swiss internationalist physician
- Louis-Léger Vauthier (1815–1901), French engineer and politician; father of Pierre
- Marcel Vauthier (1910–1988), French politician
- Paul Moreau-Vauthier (1871–1936), French sculptor
- Pierre Louis Léger Vauthier (1845-1916), French painter; son of Louis-Léger
