= Antoine-Charles =

Antoine-Charles is a masculine given name. Notable people with the name include:

- Antoine-Charles Taschereau, government official in Lower Canada
- Antoine-Charles Vauthier, French entomologist, botanist, writer, and illustrator

== See also ==
- Charles-Antoine, masculine given name
