= Charles-Antoine =

Charles-Antoine is a masculine given name. Notable people with the name include:

- Charles-Antoine Bridan, French sculptor
- Charles-Antoine Leclerc de La Bruère, French historian and diplomat
- Charles-Antoine Cambon, French scenographer
- Charles-Antoine Campion, French-Italian composer
- Charles-Antoine Clevenbergh, Flemish still life painter
- Charles-Antoine Coypel, French painter, art critic, and playwright
- Charles-Antoine Jombert, French bookseller and publisher
- Charles-Antoine Hérault, French landscape painter
- Charles-Antoine Kouakou (born 1998), French Paralympic athlete
- Charles-Antoine Lamoral, French-born businessman
- Charles-Antoine Rochat, French diplomat

== See also ==
- Antoine-Charles, masculine given name
- Charles-Antoine-Ernest Gagnon, notary and politician in Quebec
