= Henry Drury Harness =

Victorian British soldier (1804–1883)

Sir Henry Drury Harness KCB
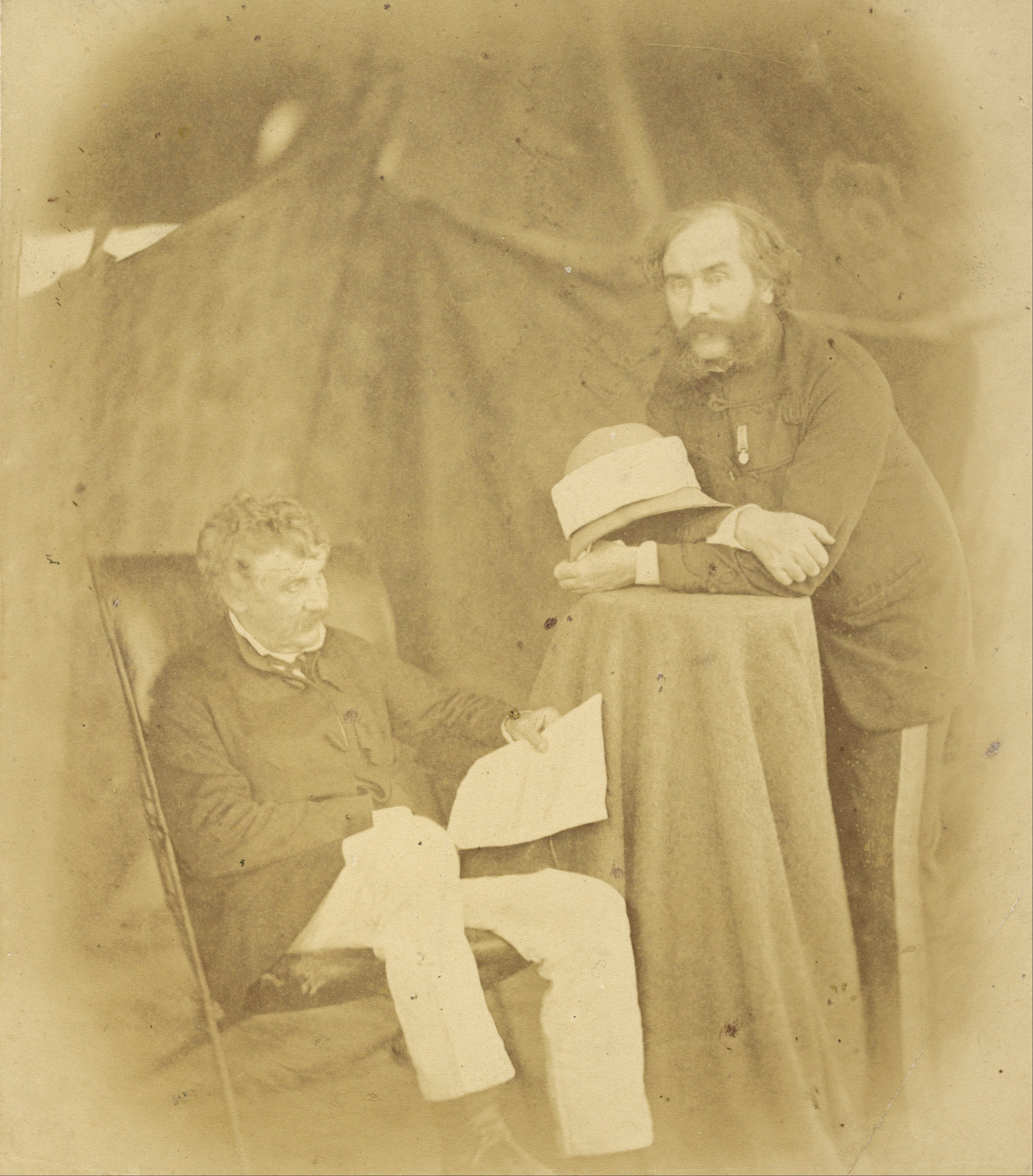
- Sir Henry Drury Harness, K.C.B., Colonel Commandant, Royal Engineers and Colonel Robert Abercromby Yule, B.E. Felice Beato c. 1857
- Born: 29 April 1804; Harrow, London
- Died: 10 February 1883 (aged 78); Barton End, Headington, Oxfordshire
- Spouse: Caroline Edmonds
- Military career
- Branch: Army
- Rank: General
- Unit: Corps of Royal Engineers
- Awards: Companion of the Order of the Bath, c. 1860; K.C.B., 1873

General Sir Henry Drury Harness KCB (29 April 1804 – 10 February 1883) was a British soldier who held several notable civil posts during his career.

== Early life ==
Henry Drury Harness was son of John Harness, M.D., commissioner of the Transport Board; William Harness was his elder brother. Henry Drury Harness graduated from the Royal Military Academy at Woolwich in 1825, but had to wait two years for a commission. During this interim period he studied mining engineering at silver mines in Mexico.

== Military career ==
After he was named second lieutenant in the Royal Engineers on 24 May 1827, Harness returned to England and went through the usual course of study at Chatham. In 1828, he married Caroline, daughter of Thomas Edmonds of Cowbridge, Glamorganshire, and in 1829 went with his company to Bermuda. He was promoted to lieutenant on 20 September 1832 and, on his return home in 1834, was appointed an instructor in fortification at the Royal Military Academy at Woolwich. He remained there for six years. During this period he compiled a textbook which became called the "Harness Papers" and formed part of the course of study at the academy for the next twenty years. In 1836-37, he contributed new passenger maps to the survey of Irish railways and, in 1840, he was appointed instructor in surveying at Chatham. He was subsequently promoted to second captain on 30 June 1843. In 1844, Harness returned to the Royal Military Academy at Woolwich as a professor of fortification.

== Report of the Irish Railways Commission ==
In 1836-37, while still Instructor of Fortification at Woolwich, he was appointed to support the Irish Railways Commission in drawing maps of population and traffic maps. He used surveys to gather data from constabularies throughout Ireland, and developed a set of maps of flows that were unique at the time and may have influenced later developers of these techniques such as Petermann. Although reported in the Royal Geographical Society at the time, no further mention of his approach was noted for almost 100 years, although Robinson credits Harness with several cartographic innovations, including the first examples of graduated circles for city population, urban and rural populations on the same map, density of population, flow lines to show movement and the dasymetric technique.

== Civil appointments ==
In 1845, he was appointed inspector of Welsh roads and assisted the county authorities in the rearrangement of the public roads as a consequence of the abolition of turnpikes. In 1846, he was appointed joint secretary with the Hon. F. Bruce to the new railway commission. When this commission was merged in a department of the board of trade, Harness remained as sole secretary.

In order to provide for the conveyance of the royal mails by railroad, the remuneration to be paid to the railway companies was to be fixed by agreement. Harness was appointed arbitrator for the post office, a very difficult duty, which he carried out in an impressive manner that greatly benefited the post office. He was promoted to first captain on 20 February 1847.

Harness was next called upon to reform the Royal Mint.The master of the mint in 1850, was a political officer whose responsibilities were limited to his parliamentary duties, and when Harness was made deputy-master he virtually became the head of the establishment. The mechanical operations of coining were, at that time, a matter of contract between the deputy-master and certain melters, assayers, and moneyers, who, besides enjoying considerable emoluments, also claimed a vested interest in the appointment of their successors. Harness substituted a government department for this system. During the progress of these reforms, the master, Richard Lalor Sheil, was appointed British minister at Florence. Sir John Herschel succeeded him, with no parliamentary responsibility. On the completion of the reorganisation in 1852, Herschel said that but for the resource and energy of Harness he could not have carried out the reforms so efficiently. Before Herschel's appointment, Harness had been promised the mastership when the proposed abolition of a political head took place. He therefore considered himself superseded and resigned the position of deputy-master, although Lord Aberdeen, then prime minister, personally pressed him to remain. After declining an offer from the Government of New Zealand, he accepted the appointment of commissioner of public works in Ireland, and remained there for two years. In addition to his ordinary duties he, as a special commissioner, carried on an inquiry into the works of the arterial drainage of Ireland, and was a commissioner for the abolition of turnpike trusts.

On June 1854 he was promoted to brevet-major and on 13 January 1855 to lieutenant-colonel. He was then brought back to England to take charge of the fortification branch of the war office, under the inspector-general of fortifications, an office he held until the close of the Crimean War, when he was appointed commanding royal engineer at Malta.

== India ==
At the outbreak of the Indian mutiny he was given the command of the royal engineers of the force, under Lord Clyde. He took part in the operations at Cawnpore, in the siege and capture of Lucknow, and subsequent operations in Rohilkund and Oude. For his Indian services Harness was mentioned several times in despatches and was thanked by the governor-general in council. He was made a C.B., and received the medal and clasps.

== Teaching ==
In 1860, after his return from India, he was appointed director of the royal engineer establishment at Chatham (later the Royal School of Military Engineering), where he was one of the most successful commandants. He became a full colonel on 3 April 1862 and a major-general on 6 March 1868. On leaving Chatham he was appointed a member of the Council for Military Education.

== Later career ==
Shortly after the outbreak of the great cattle plague in 1866, Lord Granville invited Harness to become head of a new temporary department in the council office. According to the clerk of the council, Sir Arthur Helps, the Privy Council heard more plain truths from Harness than they were accustomed to. He declined positions with the governments of Bermuda and Guernsey. He was made a K.C.B. in 1873, and was awarded a good service pension.

== Retirement and death ==
He was promoted to lieutenant-general and made a colonel-commandant of the Royal Engineers in June 1877, and retired in October 1878 as a full general. Henry Drury Harness died on 10 February 1883 at Barton End, Headington, Oxfordshire and is buried in St Andrew's churchyard, Old Headington.

Upon his death George Robert Gleig, chaplain-general to the forces, wrote:

I have lived long in the world and conversed with men of all orders of mind as well as of all professions, but among them I never found one in whose society I so much delighted as in his. His powers of narrative were remarkable. I invariably heard from him something which I loved to carry away. He was so gentle, so pure-minded, so simple in his tastes, so just in his estimate of character.

A portrait of Harness, painted by Mr. Archer, is hung in the mess of the Royal Engineers at Chatham.
