= Charles-Antoine Rochat =

French diplomat

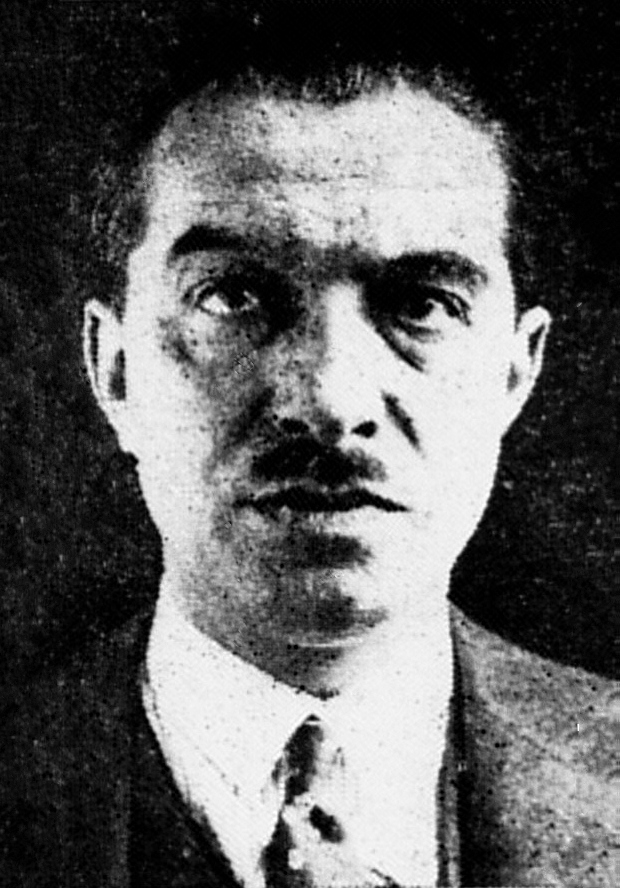
- Rochat in 1941
- Born: 1 June 1892; Chambéry, France
- Died: 31 March 1975 (aged 82); Annecy, France

Charles-Antoine Rochat (French pronunciation: [ʃaʁl ɑ̃twan ʁɔʃa]; 1 June 1892 – 31 March 1975) was a French diplomat.

== Early life ==
Charles-Antoine Rochat was born on 1 June 1892 in Chambéry, France.

== Career ==
He served as the Secretary General of the Ministry of Foreign Affairs and International Development from 3 January 1942 to August 1944.

== Death ==
He died on 31 March 1975 in Annecy, France.
