= Field (geography) =

Property that varies over space

A geographic field, "mean annual precipitation," visualized with an isarithmic map.

In the context of spatial analysis, geographic information systems, and geographic information science, a field is a property that fills space, and varies over space, such as temperature or density. This use of the term has been adopted from physics and mathematics, due to their similarity to physical fields (vector or scalar) such as the electromagnetic field or gravitational field. Synonymous terms include spatially dependent variable (geostatistics), statistical surface ( thematic mapping), and intensive property (physics and chemistry) and crossbreeding between these disciplines is common. The simplest formal model for a field is the function, which yields a single value given a point in space (i.e., t = f(x, y, z) )

== History ==
The modeling and analysis of fields in geographic applications was developed in five essentially separate movements, all of which arose during the 1950s and 1960s:

- Cartographic techniques for visualizing fields in thematic maps, including choropleth and isarithmic maps. In theoretical cartography, the concept of a "statistical surface" had gained wide acceptance by 1960, using the metaphor of a third dimension to conceptualize continuous quantitative variation in a variable. The statistical surface as a concept and term has persisted in cartography to the present.
- The quantitative revolution of geography, starting in the 1950s, and leading to the modern discipline of spatial analysis; especially techniques such as the Gravity model and models of potential. Although they did not specifically use the term field, they were incorporating the mathematics of fields from physics.
- The development of raster GIS models and software, starting with the Canadian Geographic Information System in the 1960s, which mapped fields such as land cover type.
- The technique of cartographic modeling, pioneered by Ian McHarg in the 1960s and later formalized for digital implementation in raster GIS by Dana Tomlin as map algebra.
- Geostatistics, which arose from mining geology starting in the 1950s, was originally developed around methods for interpolating the continuous variation in fields from finite point samples. Terms such as regionalized variable were often used in the literature rather than "field."

While all of these incorporated similar concepts, none of them used the term "field" consistently, and the integration of the underlying conceptual models of these applications has only occurred since 1990 as part of the emergence of Geographic information science.

During the 1980s, the maturation of the core technologies of GIS enabled academics to begin to theorize about the fundamental concepts of geographic space upon which the software seemed to be based. Donna Peuquet, Helen Couclelis, and others began to recognize that the competing vector and raster data models were based on a duality between a view of the world as filled with objects and a "location-based" or "image-based" view of the world filled with properties of location. Michael F. Goodchild introduced the term field from physics by 1992 to formalize the location-property conceptual model. During the 1990s, the raster-vector debate transformed into a debate over whether the "object view" or the "field view" was dominant, whether one reflected the nature of the real world and the other was merely a conceptual abstraction.

== The nature and types of fields ==
Fields are useful in geographic thought and analysis because when properties vary over space, they tend to do so in spatial patterns due to underlying spatial structures and processes. A common pattern is, according to Tobler's first law of geography: "Everything is related to everything else, but near things are more related than distant things." That is, fields (especially those found in nature) tend to vary gradually, with nearby locations having similar values. This concept has been formalized as spatial dependence or spatial autocorrelation, which underlies the method of geostatistics. A parallel concept that has received less publicity, but has underlain geographic theory since at least Alexander von Humboldt is spatial association, which describes how phenomena are similarly distributed. This concept is regularly used in the method of map algebra.

Even though the basic concept of a field came from physics, geographers have developed independent theories, data models, and analytical methods. One reason for this apparent disconnect is that although geographic fields may show patterns similar to gravity and magnetism, they can have a very different underlying nature, and be created by very different processes. Geographic fields can be classified by their ontology or fundamental nature as:

- Natural fields, properties of matter that are formed at scales below that of human perception, and thus appear continuous at human scales, such as temperature or soil moisture.
- Aggregate fields, statistically constructed properties of aggregate groups of individuals, such as Population density or tree canopy coverage.
- Fields of potential or influence, which measure conceptual, non-material quantities (and are thus most closely related to the fields of physics), such as the probability that a person at any given location will prefer to use a particular grocery store.

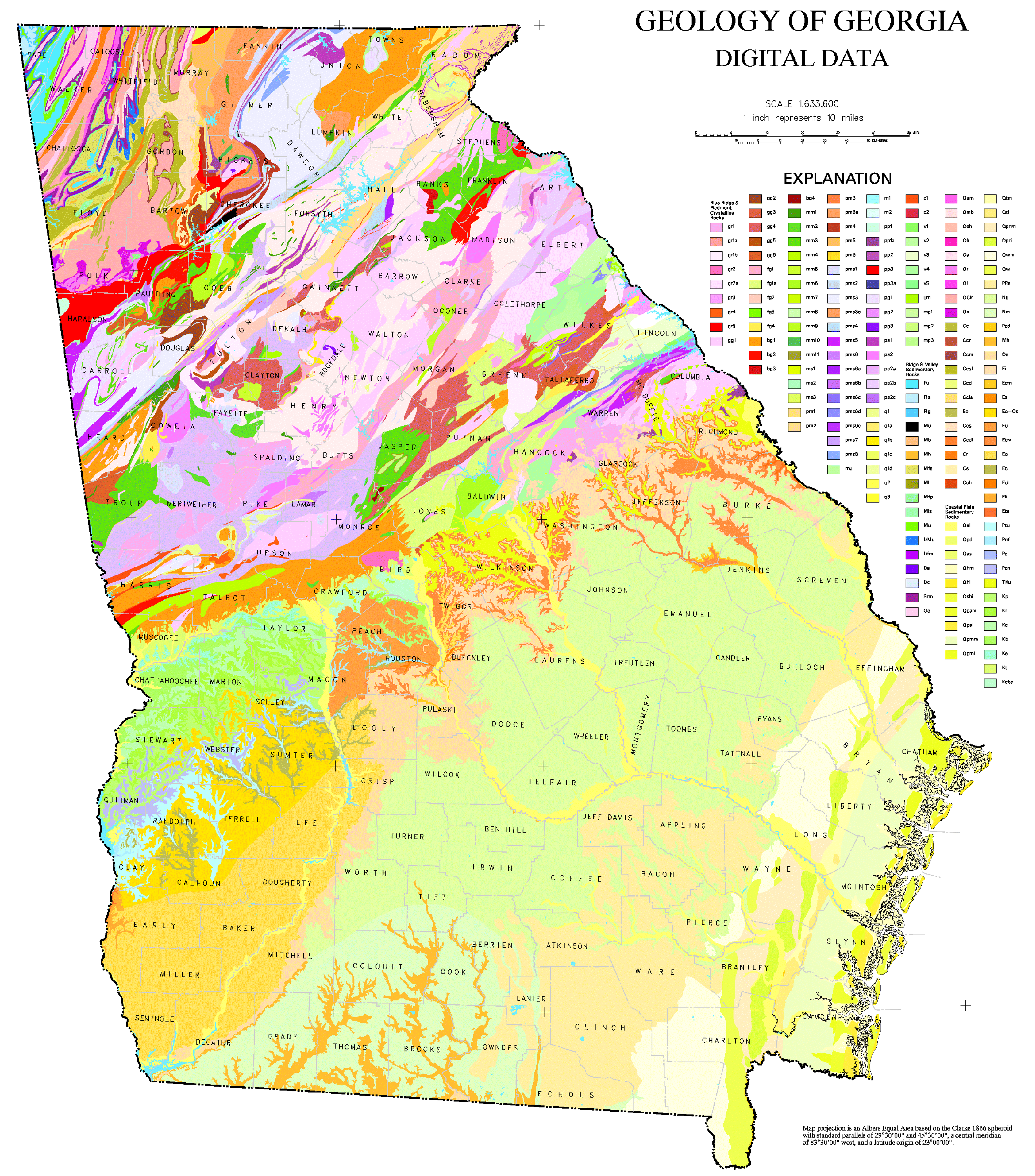
Surface geologic formation in Georgia, a discrete field, visualized with a chorochromatic map.

Geographic fields can also be categorized according to the type of domain of the measured variable, which determines the pattern of spatial change. A continuous field has a continuous (real number) domain, and typically shows gradual change over space, such as temperature or soil moisture; a discrete field, also known as a categorical coverage or area-class map, has a discrete (often qualitative) domain, such as land cover type, soil class, or surface geologic formation, and typically has a pattern of regions of homogeneous value with boundaries (or transition zones) where the value changes.

Both scalar (having a single value for any location) and vector (having multiple values for any location representing different but related properties) fields are found in geographic applications, although the former is more common.

Geographic fields can exist over a temporal domain as well as space. For example, temperature varies over time as well as location in space. In fact, many of the methods used in time geography and similar spatiotemporal models treat the location of an individual as a function or field over time.

== Representation models ==
Because, in theory, a field consists of an infinite number of values at an infinite number of locations, exhibiting a non-parametric pattern, only finite sample-based representations can be used in analytical and visualization tools such as GIS, statistics, and maps. Thus, several conceptual, mathematical and data models have emerged to approximate fields, including:

- An irregular point sample, a finite set of sample locations, at either random or strategic locations. Examples include data from weather stations or Lidar point clouds.
- Raster DEM of Earth's surface with elevations shaded such that lighter values indicate higher elevation
  A lattice, or regular point sample, consisting of locations that are evenly spaced in each cartesian direction. These are typically stored in a Raster data structure. Examples include the Digital elevation model.
- A Choropleth, an irregular a priori partition, in which space is partitioned into regions unrelated to the field itself, such as countries, and field values are summarized over each region. These are typically stored using vector polygons. Examples would include Population density by county, derived from census returns.
- A Chorochromatic map or Area-class map, an irregular strategic partition usually used for discrete fields, in which space is partitioned into regions intended to match regions of homogeneous field value, typically stored as vector polygons. Examples include maps of geologic layers or vegetation stands.
- A grid or regular partition, in which space is partitioned into equal regions (often squares), and field values are summarized over each region. These are also typically stored in a Raster data structure. Examples include the electromagnetic reflectance signature of land cover as represented in Remote sensing imagery.
- A surface, in which the field is conceptualized as a third spatial dimension, and three dimensional data models are used for representation. Examples include the Triangulated irregular network (TIN).
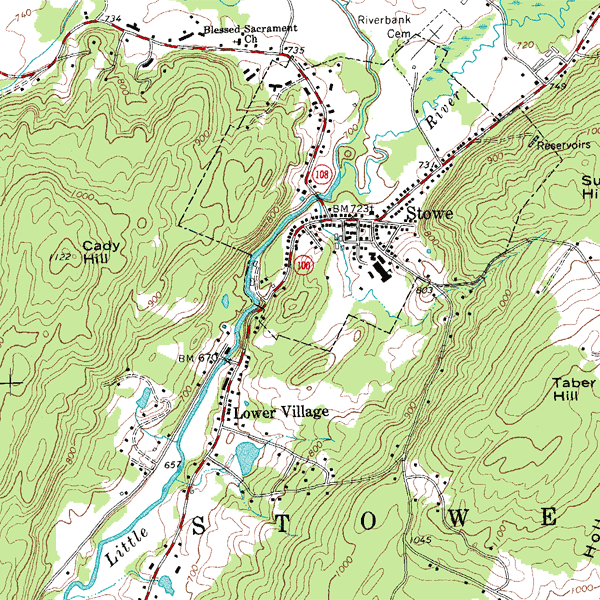
- Topographic map of Stowe, Vermont. The brown contour lines represent the elevation. The contour interval is 20 feet.
  An isarithm or isopleth, in which lines are drawn connecting locations of equal field value, partitioning space into regions of similar value. An example is the Contour line of elevation, commonly found on topographic maps.

The choice of representation model typically depends on a variety of factors, including the analyst's conceptual model of the phenomenon, the devices or methods available to measure the field, the tools and techniques available to analyze or visualize the field, and the models being used for other phenomena with which the field in question will be integrated. It is common to transform data from one model to another; for example, an isarithmic weather map of temperature is often generated from a raster grid, which was created from raw weather station data (an irregular point sample). Every such transformation requires Interpolation to estimate field values between or within the sample locations, which can lead to a number of forms of uncertainty, or misinterpretation traps such as the Ecological fallacy and the Modifiable areal unit problem. This also means that when data is transformed from one model to another, the result will always be less certain than the source.

== See also ==
- Feature (geography)
- Region (geography)
