= Louis Vauthier =

Swiss physician and internationalist

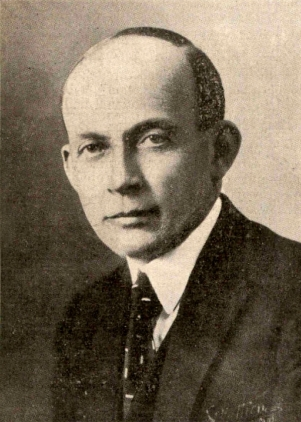
c. 1934

Louis Constant Vauthier (20 July 1887 - 18 March 1963) was a Swiss physician and internationalist who started a Swiss University sanatorium (Le Sanatorium Universitaire Suisse) in Leysin which also served as an international cultural exchange center.

Vauthier was born in Pâquier, in the canton of Neuchâtel. He was educated at the University of Geneva and later worked at the Vaudois Sanatorium and impressed by the idealism, he started a Swiss University Sanatorium in 1922 where he brought people from around the world to share their knowledge, art and culture. The idea was that any academics who needed treatment could go to the sanatorium at a low rate of about 10 Swiss Francs a year (students) and 20 Swiss Francs for professors with a day rate to cover food at 6.5 Francs. In the first year of its operation there were 32 inmates and it was planned to expand to 200 beds towards the end of the 1920s but he was sidelined later and kept as a mentor for the project. He built a large network of connections to reach out across the world. Famous visitors included Mohandas Gandhi who was impressed by its cleanliness but did not leave any comments in the guest book. Vauthier's experiment came to an end in 1961 following the rise of antibiotic treatments which replaced sanatoriums for the treatment of tuberculosis.

Vauthier married Madeleine, sister of Jean Piaget.
