= Louis-Léger Vauthier =

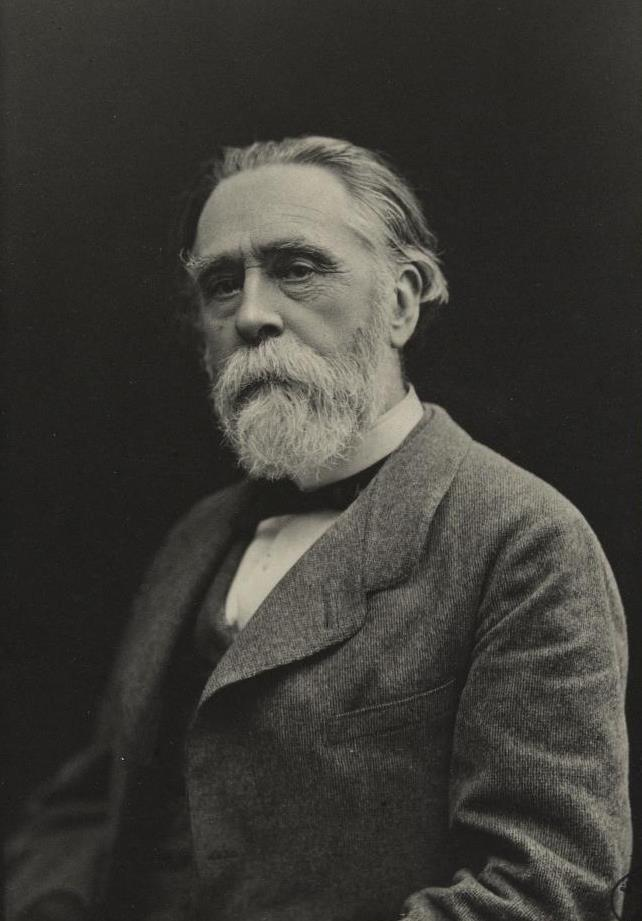
Louis-Léger Vauthier

Louis-Léger Vauthier (6 April 1815 – 5 October 1901) was a French engineer who designed bridges and roadways and was elected to the National Assembly of France in May 1849, as a member for the departement of Cher.

Vauthier was born in Bergerac in the Dordogne department. Although deported for his revolutionary ideas, he became a civil engineer in Spain and then Switzerland before returning to Paris in 1861. He also spent several years in Recife, Brazil.

He is known to have proposed an early idea for a "Chemin de fer circulaire intérieur" in 1865 - which would have formed an early Paris Metro. And again in 1872, 1886 and 1887 he put forward more ideas for an urban transit system in the capital.

In cartography, he is also credited with one of the earliest (if not the first) thematic map to use contour lines to display a non-geographic variable on map--- a contour map of the population of Paris in 1874.
