= Antoine-Charles Vauthier =

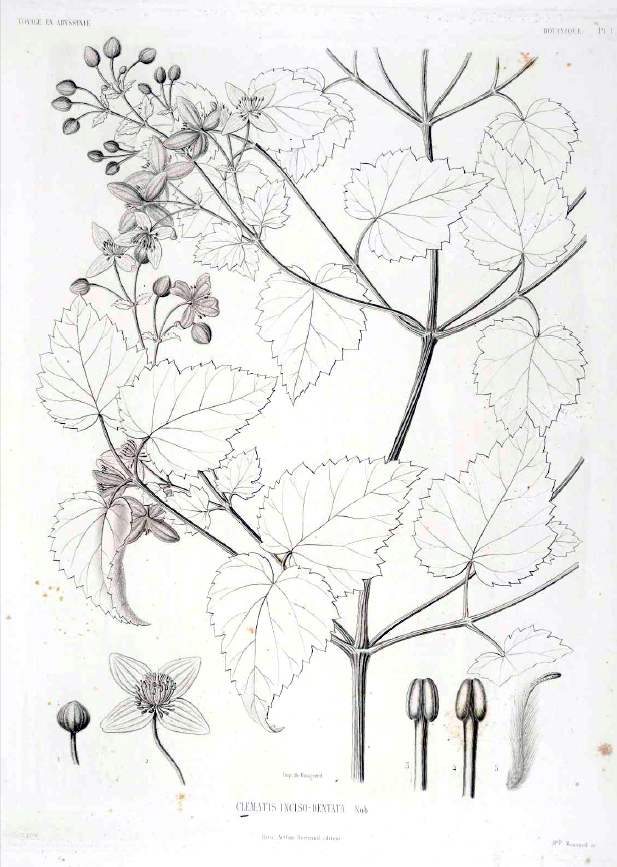
Clematis hirsuta Guill. & Perr.

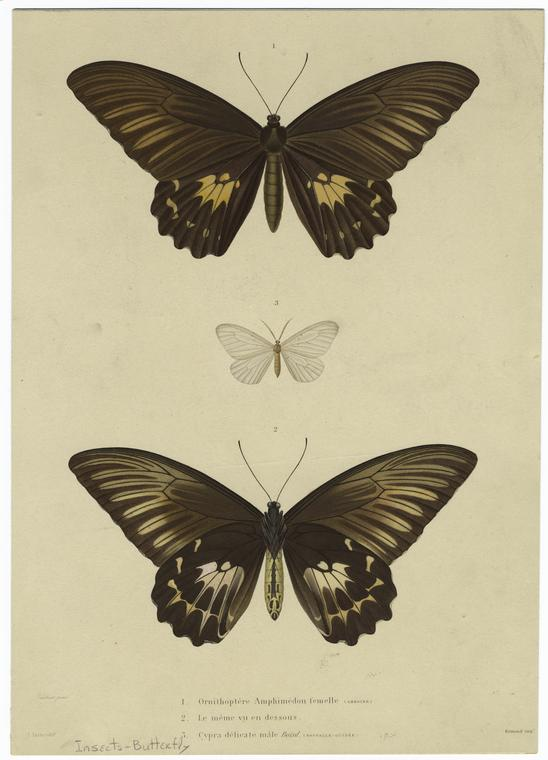

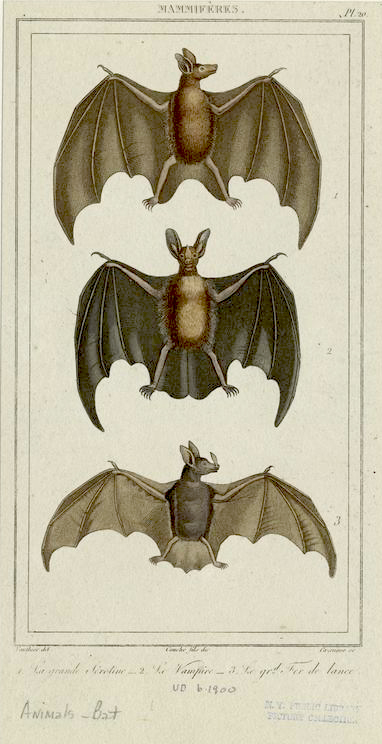

Antoine-Charles Vauthier (1790 Paris – 1879 Paris) was a French entomologist, botanist, writer and natural history illustrator. His brother Jules-Antoine Vauthier was also a prominent artist of his day. Their father was Michel Vauthier, a miniaturist at Versailles and later a publisher and art dealer in Paris.

Vauthier was a collector of plants and insects in Brazil, arriving in Rio de Janeiro in December 1831 and returning to France, arriving at the port of Toulon on 21 May 1833.

He wrote a number of books, including Description of a new species of arachnid of the genus Epeira, of M. Walckenaer (1825). Vauthier illustrated several books written by his brother-in-law Achille Richard. Vauthier also depicted many animals and is commemorated in some 40 species names.

== Publications ==
- "Histoire Naturelle des Lépidoptères ou Papillons de France" – Philogene Auguste Joseph Duponchel, Antoine-Charles Vauthier, Paul Chrétien Romain Constant Duménil
- "Voyage autour du monde :exécuté pendant les années 1836 et 1837 sur la corvette la Bonite" (1840-1866)
- "Florae Senegambiae Tentamen" – Jean-Antoine Guillemin, Samuel Perrotet, Achille Richard (Paris 1830-1833) Plates by Joseph Decaisne, Samuel Perrotet & Antoine-Charles Vauthier
