= Petreny, Moldova =

Cucuteni-Trypillian culture settlement IN Moldova dating to 4000-3600 BCE

Petreny, Moldova is a Cucuteni–Trypillian culture settlement dating to 4000-3600 BC which had 500 buildings covering an area of 30 hectare. The layout of the settlement consists of concentric circles of buildings, similar to other Cucuteni–Trypillian settlements, but at Petreny there are the very high number of 10 concentric circles. Most of the building was the same size, but some was considerably larger at the length of 15 x 6 m.

This proto-city are just one of 2440 Cucuteni-Trypillia settlements discovered so far in Moldova and Ukraine and Romania. 194 (8%) of these settlements had an area of more than 10 hectares between 5000 - 2700 B.C. and more than 29 settlements had an area in the range 100 - 300 - 450 Hectares.

== See also ==
- Danube civilization
