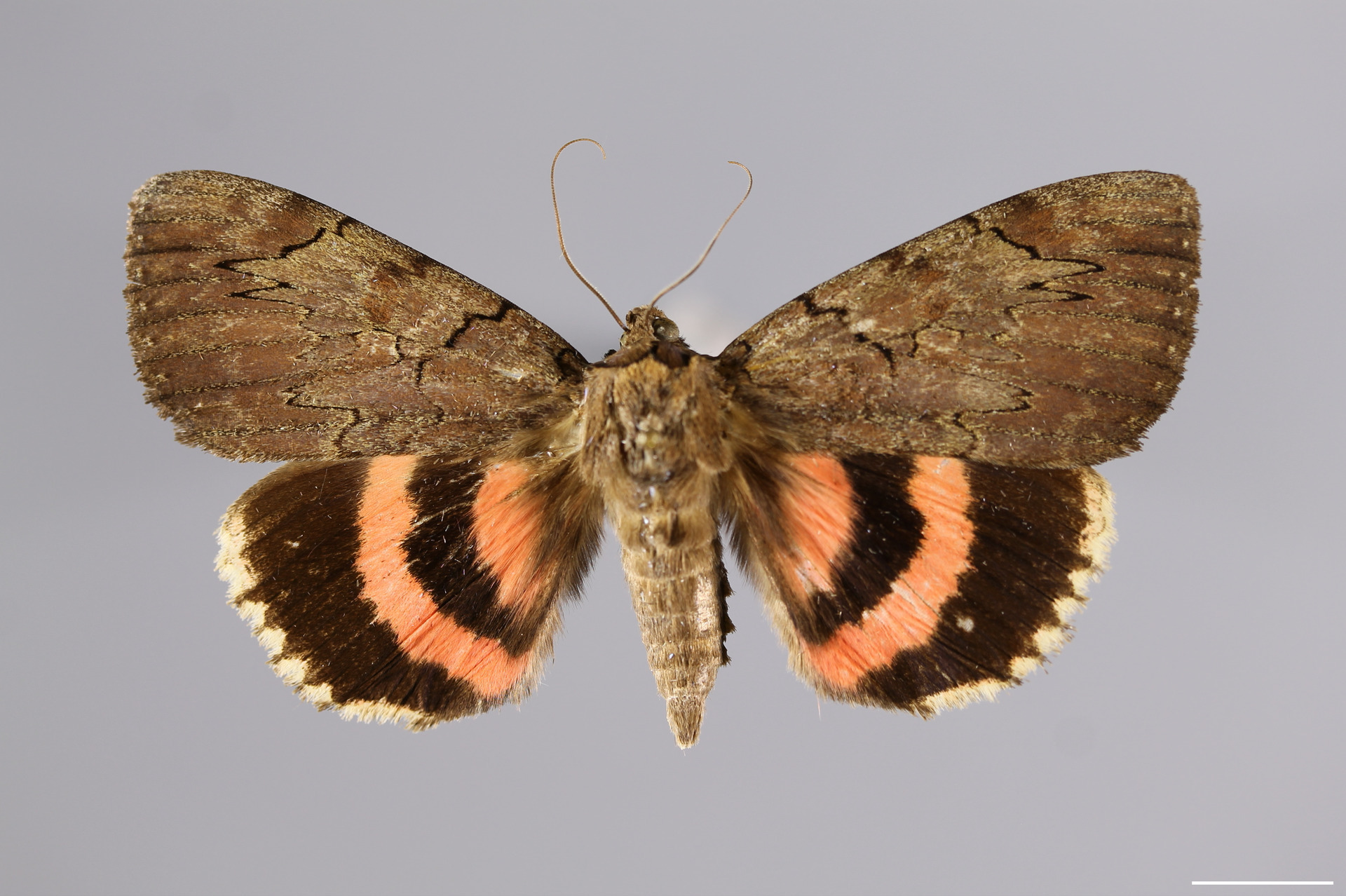
- Upperside of imago from Kane County, Illinois

Scientific classification
- Kingdom: Animalia
- Phylum: Arthropoda
- Clade: Pancrustacea
- Class: Insecta
- Order: Lepidoptera
- Superfamily: Noctuoidea
- Family: Erebidae
- Genus: Catocala
- Species: C. cara

Binomial name
- Catocala cara Guenée in Boisduval & Guenée, 1852

= Catocala cara =

Darling underwing

Species of moth

Catocala cara, the darling underwing, is a moth of the family Erebidae. The species was first described by Achille Guenée in 1852. It can be found in the United States east of the Rocky Mountains; it occurs west at least to Oklahoma and north at least to Illinois. It also ranges into southern Canada, but only barely so.

== Description and ecology ==
The wingspan is 70–85 mm. The forewings are dark purplish brown above, and light cream below. The hindwings have a deep scarlet-pink ground color with a pattern of two clean concentric blackish bands per wing, one through the midwing and one along the pale outer margin. The hindwing base is heavily covered in dark hairs; at a casual glance it may thus appear as if at the center of the dark bands there is a black spot or streak. As in many relatives, the foreleg tibia of this species possess no spines, while the tarsi carry three rows of spines.

The adult moths flies from June to October depending on the location. The caterpillars feed on Populus (poplar and cottonwood) and Salix (willow) species, especially black willow (S. nigra).

== Classification ==
This moth is placed in the subfamily Catocalinae, either of the owlet moth family, Noctuidae, or – if the Noctuidae are circumscribed more strictly – of family Erebidae. Within the Catocalinae, it belongs to tribe Catocalini and – if the Noctuidae are circumscribed widely – subtribe Catocalina.

The former subspecies C. c. carissima, which occurs to the south of the darling underwing, is now again considered to be a valid species Catocala carissima (carissima underwing); this also includes the supposed species C. silvia, which actually is merely a form with no formal taxonomic standing.
