= Charles Dupin =

French Catholic mathematician, economist and politician (1784–1873)

Pierre Charles François Dupin
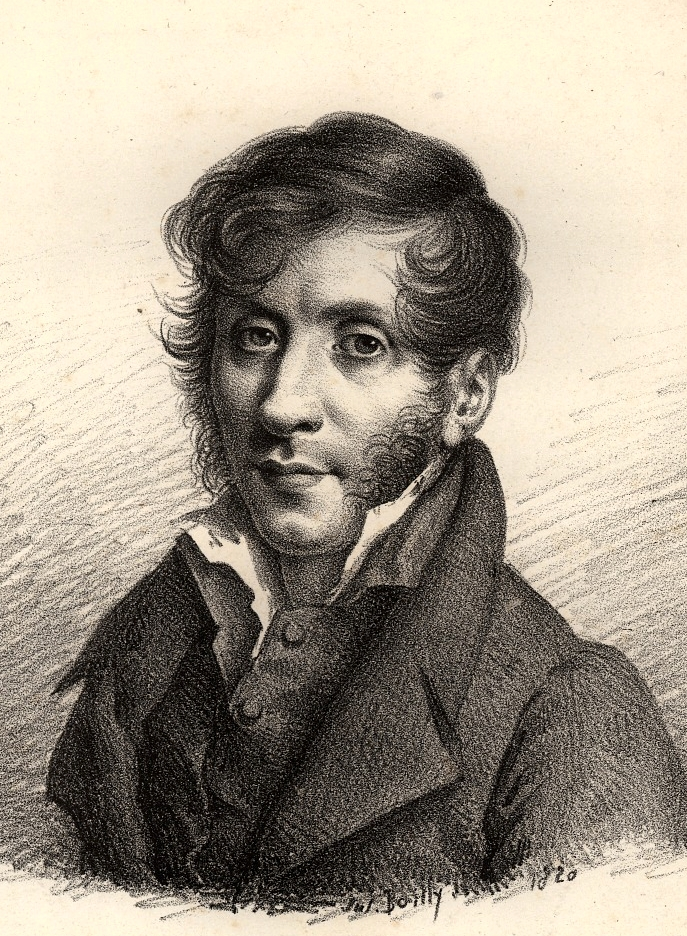
- Born: 6 October 1784; Varzy, France
- Died: 18 January 1873 (aged 88); Paris, France
- Known for: Choropleth map Dupin cyclide Dupin hypersurface Dupin indicatrix Dupin's theorem Malus-Dupin theorem
- Scientific career
- Fields: Mathematics; Engineering; Economics

Baron Pierre Charles François Dupin (French pronunciation: [pjɛʁ ʃaʁl fʁɑ̃swa dypɛ̃]; 6 October 1784, Varzy, Nièvre – 18 January 1873, Paris, France) was a French Catholic mathematician, engineer, economist and politician, particularly known for work in the field of mathematics, where the Dupin cyclide and Dupin indicatrix are named after him; and for his work in the fields of statistical and thematic mapping. In 1826 he created the earliest known choropleth map.

== Life and work ==
He was born in Varzy in France, the son of Charles Andre Dupin, a lawyer, and Catherine Agnes Dupin. His elder brother is André Marie Jean Jacques Dupin.

Dupin studied geometry with Monge at the École Polytechnique and then became a naval engineer (ENSTA). His mathematical work was in descriptive and differential geometry. He was the discoverer of conjugate tangents to a point on a surface and of the Dupin indicatrix. Dupin participated in the Greek science revival by teaching mathematics and mechanics lessons in Corfu in 1808. One of his students was Giovanni Carandino, who would go on to be the founder of the Greek Mathematics School in the 1820s.

From 1807 Dupin was responsible for the restoration of the damaged port and arsenal at Corfu. He founded the Toulon Maritime Museum in 1813.

In 1818, Dupin was elected to the body of the French Academy of Sciences, one of the Institut de France's five Academies.

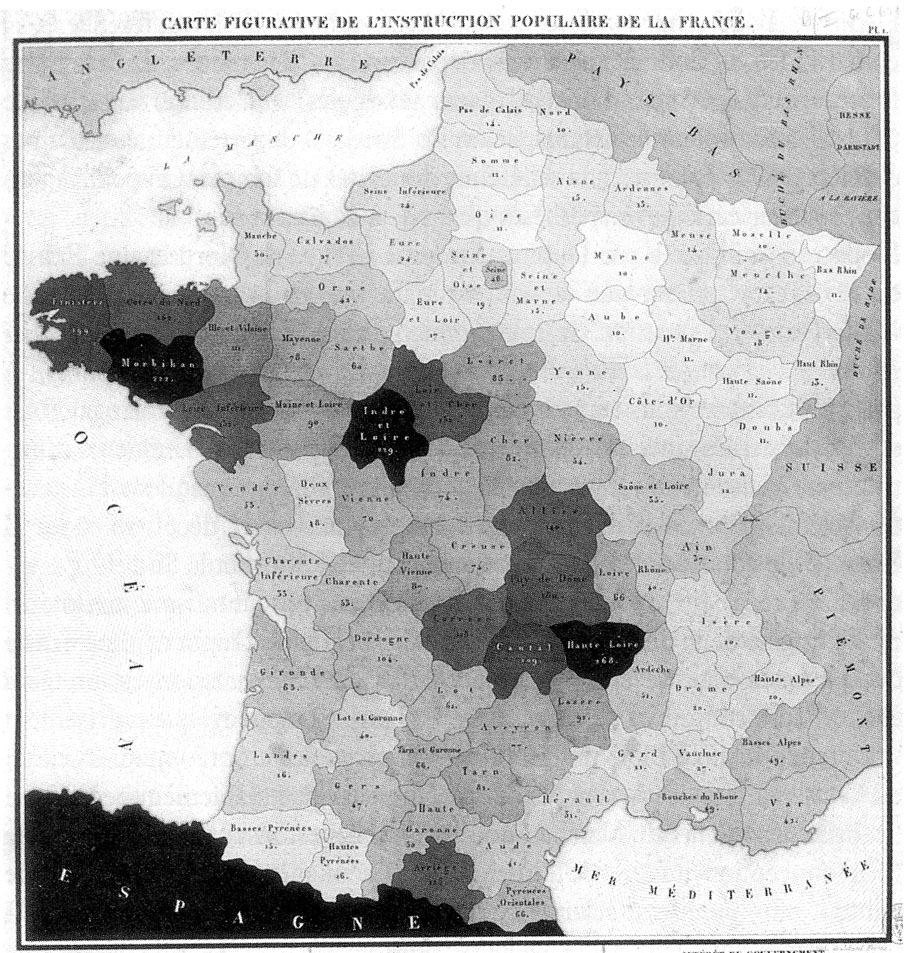
1826 choropleth map of school enrollment in France.

He was appointed professor at the Conservatoire des Arts et Métiers in 1819; he kept this post until 1854. In 1822, Dupin was elected a foreign member of the Royal Swedish Academy of Sciences. He was made a baron in 1824. In 1826 he published a thematic map showing the distribution of illiteracy in France, using shadings (from black to white), the first known instance of what is called a choropleth map today. Dupin had been inspired by the work of the German statisticians Georg Hassel and August Friedrich Wilhelm Crome. Dupin was named rapporteur for the central jury of the Exposition des produits de l'industrie française en 1834. For each branch of industry he noted the quantities and value of French exports and imports, with comparative figures for 1823, 1827 and 1834.

Dupin also had a political career and was appointed to the Senate in 1852.

== Selected publications ==
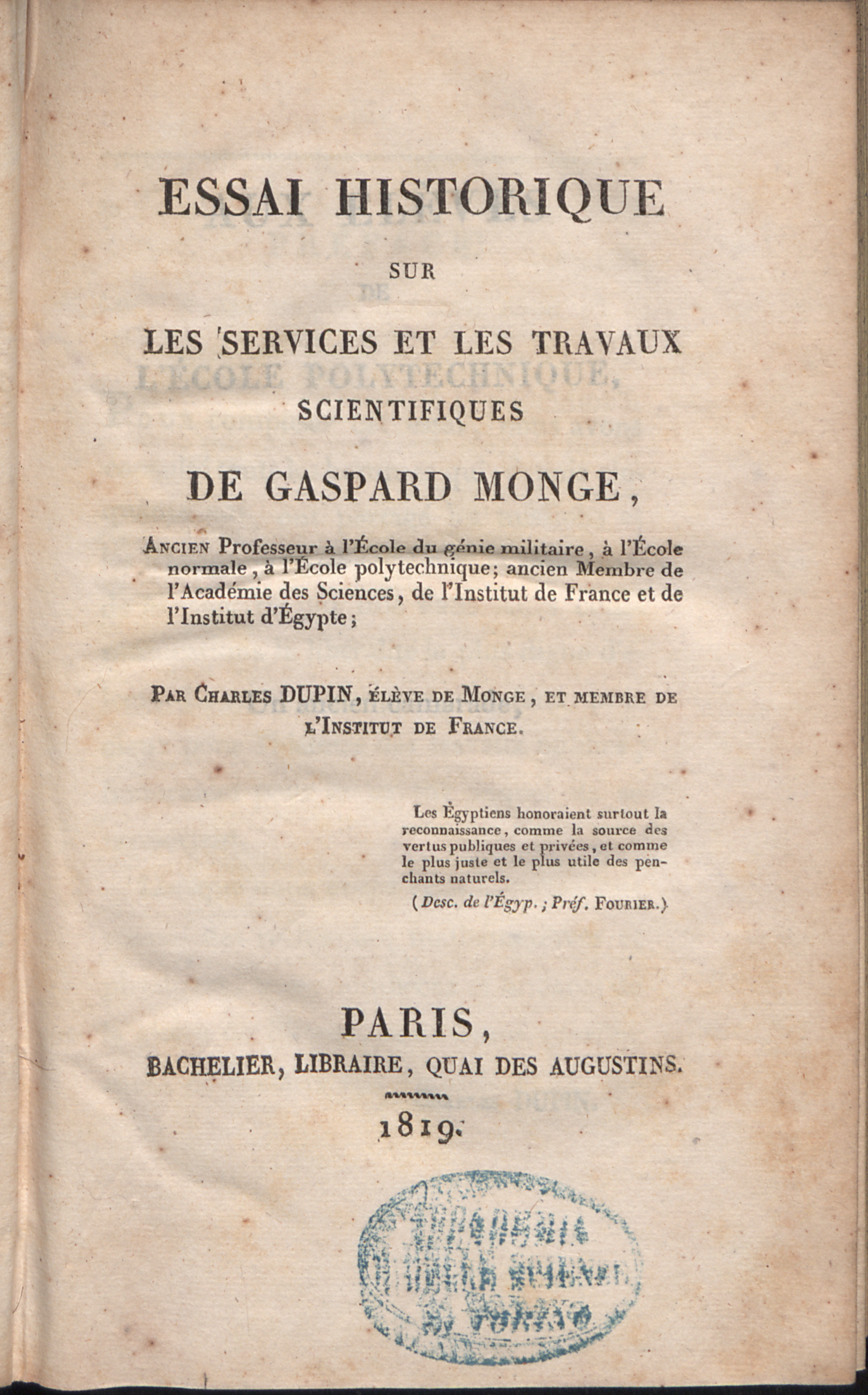
Essai historique sur les services et les travaux scientifiques de Gaspard Monge, 1819

- Dupin, François Pierre Charles. Développements de géométrie. (1813).
- Dupin, François Pierre Charles. Discours et leçons sur l'industrie, le commerce, la marine, et sur les sciences appliquées aux arts. 1825.
- Dupin, François Pierre Charles. Canal maritime de Suez. Imprimerie de Mallet-Bachelier, 1858.
- Developments in geometry, with applications to the stability of vessels, to cuts and embankments, to scrolling, to optics, etc. to follow on from the descriptive geometry and the analytical geometry of M. Monge: Theory, Paris, V e Courcier,1813, 373 p. ( read online [ archive ] ).
- Memoirs on the navy and the bridges and roads of France and England: containing two accounts of voyages made by the author in the ports of England, Scotland and Ireland, in the years 1816, 1817 and 1818; the description of the Plymouth jetty, the Caledonian Canal, etc., Paris, Bachelier,1818, 468 p. ( read online [ archive ] )— Dedicated to Prony .
- Letter to Mylady Morgan on Racine and Shakespeare [ archive ], 1818; a rare foray of Dupin's pen outside of science and politics. Dupin critiques a best-selling book by Lady Morgan, née Sydney Owenson.
- Historical essay on the services and scientific works of Gaspard Monge [ archive ], 1819 (Digitization: Gallica )
- Applications of geometry and mechanics, to the navy, bridges and roads, etc., to follow on from the Developments of geometry [ archive ], 1822
- (with Laplace, Prony, Girard and Ampère ) Report made to the Institut de France, (Academy of Sciences), on the advantages, on the disadvantages, and on the comparative dangers of steam engines, in simple, medium and high pressure systems [ archive ], 1823
- Travels in Great Britain, undertaken in relation to the public services of war, the navy, and bridges and roads, to commerce and industry since 1816, Paris, Bachelier, 1825, 6 volumes, 3 parts :

Volumes 1 & 2: Military force. Constitution of the army. Studies & works [ archive ] .

Volumes 3 & 4: Naval force. Constitution of the navy . Studies & works.

Volumes 5 & 6: Commercial force (public works and associations section). Public roads, squares, streets, roads, canals, bridges and highways, coasts and seaports.
