= Isogonal =

Isogonal, a mathematical term meaning "having similar angles", may refer to:

- Isogonal figure or polygon, polyhedron, polytope or tiling
- Isogonal trajectory, in curve theory
- Isogonal conjugate, in triangle geometry

== See also ==
- Isogonic line, in the study of Earth's magnetic field, a line of constant magnetic declination
