= Christopher L.-H. Huang =

Christopher Li-Hur Huang (born 28 December 1951) is an Asian-British physiologist and academic, known for his contributions in cellular physiology. He is Emeritus Professor of Cell Physiology at the University of Cambridge and Fellow Emeritus of Murray Edwards College, Cambridge, UK.

Huang's research addresses the generation, propagation and transduction of biological signals at the cellular and systems levels. It particularly focusses on the mechanisms underlying skeletal and cardiac muscle activation.

== Early life and education ==
Christopher Huang was born in Singapore in 1951. His school education was in Malaysia and Singapore, the latter culminating in award of a President's Scholarship. He was elected to a Florence Heale Open Scholarship at The Queen's College, University of Oxford, to read for a B.A. in Physiological Sciences conferred in 1974, and clinical training, with medical degrees (B.M., B.Ch.) conferred in 1976.

Following pre-registration appointments (1977-8) in the Nuffield Department of Medicine, Oxford, he pursued research in the University of Cambridge as a Medical Research Council (MRC) Scholar in Gonville and Caius College, Cambridge under the supervision of Lord Adrian, completing a Ph.D. in membrane biophysics in 1979. He was subsequently conferred degrees of D.M. by Oxford in 1985, M.D. by Cambridge in 1986, and D.Sc. (Oxford) and Sc.D. (Cambridge) both in 1995. He was elected Fellow of The Royal Society of Biology (FRSB) in 2011, European Society of Cardiology (FESC) in 2016, Physiological Society (FTPS) in 2017, and Sigma Xi in 2025. He is a recipient of the Benefactor's and Brian Johnson (Oxford), Gedge (Cambridge) and LEPRA (British Leprosy Relief Association) Prizes.

== Research ==
Huang's research has focused on biophysical mechanisms of signal transduction and propagation in excitable tissues. These multidisciplinary studies employed electrophysiological, confocal, electron microscopic and magnetic resonance imaging, and mathematical modeling, methods.

His early work explored striated muscle excitation-contraction coupling and osteoclastic bone resorption, clarifying their activation mechanisms and local and systemic, control and feedback modulation. He also modelled the cell electrolyte homeostasis underpinning these processes. He is best known for his work on cardiac electrophysiology and arrhythmogenesis in murine models of inherited and acquired cardiac clinical conditions. This elucidated the physiological roles of intracellular calcium homeostasis, activation and restitution dynamics, conduction velocity, and after-depolarization phenomena in cardiac arrhythmogenesis. It was applied to the Brugada, long QT (LQT3, LQT5), Scn3b-/-, catecholaminergic polymorphic ventricular tachycardic, hypokalaemic and metabolic cardiac disease syndromes.

Industrial and Translational Work

Of pharmaceutical and biotechnology companies, Huang has collaborated with GlaxoSmithKline (GSK), Xention, NeuroSearch Pharmaceuticals and BioMarin. His translational work applied fundamental physiological findings to regeneration in injured peripheral nerve, and management of migraine aura and cardiac arrhythmias, particularly atrial fibrillation and sudden cardiac death. Some of this work received widespread media coverage, including features in BBC News, and The Times, Independent, Daily Telegraph and Guardian. His modernized classification of clinically used anti-arrhythmic drugs was adopted in International, European Society of Cardiology (ESC), 2025 clinical therapeutic guidelines.

== Selected publications ==
=== Books and monographs ===
- Huang, Christopher L.-H. (1993). Intramembrane charge movements in striated muscle. Oxford medical publications. Oxford : Oxford; New York: Clarendon Press; Oxford University Press. ISBN 978-0-19-857749-2.
- Glasby, M. A.; Huang, Christopher L.-H., eds. (1997). Applied physiology for surgery and critical care (Paperback ed.). Oxford: Butterworth-Heinemann. ISBN 978-0-7506-3593-6.
- Zaidi, Mone; Adebanjo, Olugbenga A.; Huang, Christopher L.-H. (1998). Molecular and cellular biology of bone. Advances in organ biology. Stamford Conn. London: JAI. ISBN 978-0-7623-0390-8.
- Usher-Smith, JA; Murrell, GAC; Ellis, HE; Huang, CL-H (2010). Research in Medicine: Planning a Project, Writing a Thesis. Cambridge University Press. ISBN 978-0-511-67816-5.
- Chambers, David; Huang, Christopher; Matthews, Gareth (2019). Basic physiology for anaesthetists (2nd ed.). Cambridge: Cambridge University Press. ISBN 978-1-108-46399-7.
- Keynes, Richard Darwin; Aidley, David John; Huang, Christopher L.-H. (2011). Nerve and muscle (4th ed.). Cambridge (G. B.): Cambridge university press. ISBN 978-0-521-51955-7.

=== Journals ===
- Huang, C. L.-H. (1982). "Pharmacological separation of charge movement components in frog skeletal muscle". The Journal of Physiology. 324 (1): 375–387. doi:10.1113/jphysiol.1982.sp014118. ISSN 0022-3751. PMC 1250711. PMID 6980275.
- Huang, C L (1983). "Time domain spectroscopy of the membrane capacitance in frog skeletal muscle". The Journal of Physiology. 341 (1): 1–24. doi:10.1113/jphysiol.1983.sp014789. ISSN 0022-3751. PMC 1195319. PMID 6604804.
- Huang, C L (1988). "Intramembrane charge movements in skeletal muscle". Physiological Reviews. 68 (4): 1197–1147. doi:10.1152/physrev.1988.68.4.1197. ISSN 0031-9333. PMID 2460881.
- Huang, C L (1 September 1990). "Voltage-dependent block of charge movement components by nifedipine in frog skeletal muscle". The Journal of General Physiology. 96 (3): 535–557. doi:10.1085/jgp.96.3.535. ISSN 0022-1295. PMC 2228997. PMID 2230711.
- Chawla, Sangeeta; Skepper, Jeremy N.; Hockaday, Austin R.; Huang, Christopher L.-H. (2001). "Calcium waves induced by hypertonic solutions in intact frog skeletal muscle fibres". The Journal of Physiology. 536 (2): 351–359. doi:10.1111/j.1469-7793.2001.0351c.xd. ISSN 0022-3751. PMC 2278869. PMID 11600671.
- Huang, Christopher L.-H.; Pedersen, Thomas H.; Fraser, James A. (2011). "Reciprocal dihydropyridine and ryanodine receptor interactions in skeletal muscle activation". Journal of Muscle Research and Cell Motility. 32 (3): 171–202. doi:10.1007/s10974-011-9262-9. ISSN 0142-4319. PMID 21993921.
- Salvage, Samantha C.; Dulhunty, Angela F.; Jeevaratnam, Kamalan; Jackson, Antony P.; Huang, Christopher L.-H. (19 June 2023). "Feedback contributions to excitation–contraction coupling in native functioning striated muscle". Philosophical Transactions of the Royal Society B: Biological Sciences. 378 (1879) 20220162. doi:10.1098/rstb.2022.0162. ISSN 0962-8436. PMC 10150225. PMID 37122213.
- Huang, Christopher L.-H.; Solaro, R. John; Ke, Yunbo; Lei, Ming (11 January 2016). "Editorial: Ca2+ Signaling and Heart Rhythm". Frontiers in Physiology. 6: 423. doi:10.3389/fphys.2015.00423. ISSN 1664-042X. PMC 4707627. PMID 26793124.
- Sabir, Ian N.; Matthews, Gareth David Kingsley; Huang, Christopher L.-H. (25 November 2013). "Sudden arrhythmic death: from basic science to clinical practice". Frontiers in Physiology. 4: 339. doi:10.3389/fphys.2013.00339. ISSN 1664-042X. PMC 3839408. PMID 24324440.
- Zaidi, Mone; Adebanjo, Olugbenga A.; Moonga, Baljit S.; Sun, Li; Huang, Christopher L.-H. (1 May 1999). "Emerging Insights into the Role of Calcium Ions in Osteoclast Regulation". Journal of Bone and Mineral Research. 14 (5): 669–674. doi:10.1359/jbmr.1999.14.5.669. ISSN 0884-0431. PMID 10320514.
- Zaidi, Mone; Moonga, Baljit S.; Huang, Christopher L.-H. (2004). "Calcium sensing and cell signaling processes in the local regulation of osteoclastic bone resorption". Biological Reviews. 79 (1): 79–100. doi:10.1017/S1464793103006262. ISSN 1464-7931. PMID 15005174.
- Fraser, James A.; Huang, Christopher L.-H. (2007). "Quantitative techniques for steady-state calculation and dynamic integrated modelling of membrane potential and intracellular ion concentrations". Progress in Biophysics and Molecular Biology. 94 (3): 336–372. doi:10.1016/j.pbiomolbio.2006.10.001. PMID 17129600.
