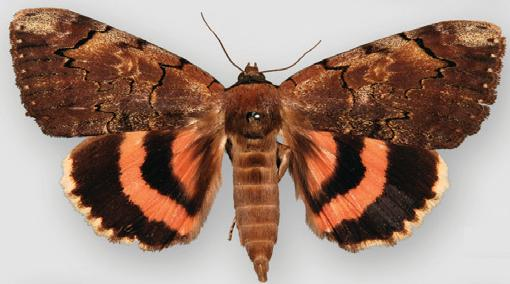

Scientific classification
- Kingdom: Animalia
- Phylum: Arthropoda
- Class: Insecta
- Order: Lepidoptera
- Superfamily: Noctuoidea
- Family: Erebidae
- Genus: Catocala
- Species: C. carissima

Binomial name
- Catocala carissima Hulst, 1880

Synonyms
- Catocala cara carissima Hulst, 1880

= Catocala carissima =

Carissima underwing

Species of moth

Catocala carissima, the carissima underwing, is a moth of the family Erebidae. The species can be found from Florida through Georgia to Texas.

It was formerly considered to be a subspecies of Catocala cara.
