= Confocal conic sections =

Conic sections with the same foci

Pencils of confocal ellipses and hyperbolas

In geometry, two conic sections are called confocal if they have the same foci.

Because ellipses and hyperbolas have two foci, there are confocal ellipses, confocal hyperbolas and confocal mixtures of ellipses and hyperbolas. In the mixture of confocal ellipses and hyperbolas, any ellipse intersects any hyperbola orthogonally (at right angles).

Parabolas have only one focus, so, by convention, confocal parabolas have the same focus and the same axis of symmetry. Consequently, any point not on the axis of symmetry lies on two confocal parabolas which intersect orthogonally (see below).

A circle is an ellipse with both foci coinciding at the center. Circles that share the same focus are called concentric circles, and they orthogonally intersect any line passing through that center.

The formal extension of the concept of confocal conics to surfaces leads to confocal quadrics.

== Confocal ellipses and hyperbolas ==
Any hyperbola or (non-circular) ellipse has two foci, and any pair of distinct points $F_1,\, F_2$ in the Euclidean plane and any third point $P$ not on line connecting them uniquely determine an ellipse and hyperbola, with shared foci $F_1,\, F_2$ and intersecting orthogonally at the point $P.$ (See Ellipse § Definition as locus of points and Hyperbola § As locus of points.)

The foci $F_1,\, F_2$ thus determine two pencils of confocal ellipses and hyperbolas.

By the principal axis theorem, the plane admits a Cartesian coordinate system with its origin at the midpoint between foci and its axes aligned with the axes of the confocal ellipses and hyperbolas. If $c$ is the linear eccentricity (half the distance between $F_1$ and $F_2$), then in this coordinate system $F_1=(c,0),\; F_2=(-c,0).$

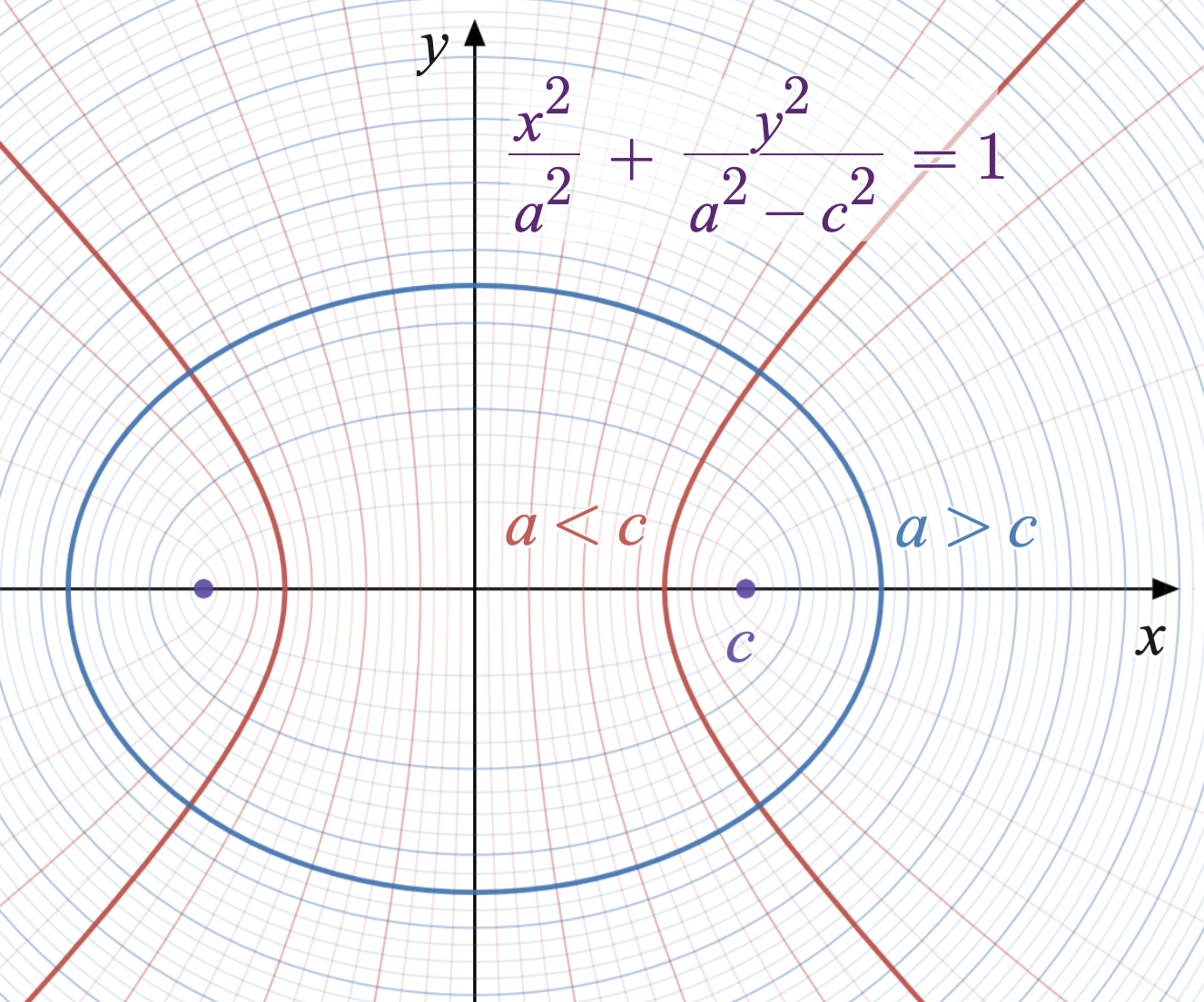
A pencil of confocal ellipses and hyperbolas is specified by choice of linear eccentricity c (the x-coordinate of one focus) and can be parametrized by the semi-major axis a (the x-coordinate of the intersection of a specific conic in the pencil and the x-axis). When 0 < a < c the conic is a hyperbola; when c < a the conic is an ellipse.

Each ellipse or hyperbola in the pencil is the locus of points satisfying the equation

$$\frac{x^2}{a^2}+\frac{y^2}{a^2-c^2}=1$$

with semi-major axis $a$ as parameter. If the semi-major axis is less than the linear eccentricity ($0<a<c$), the equation defines a hyperbola, while if the semi-major axis is greater than the linear eccentricity ($a>c$), it defines an ellipse.

Another common representation specifies a pencil of ellipses and hyperbolas confocal with a given ellipse of semi-major axis $a$ and semi-minor axis $b$ (so that $0 < b < a$), each conic generated by choice of the parameter $\lambda\colon$

$$\frac{x^2}{a^2-\lambda} + \frac{y^2}{b^2-\lambda} = 1,$$

If $-\infty < \lambda < b^2,$ the conic is an ellipse. If $b^2 < \lambda < a^2,$ the conic is a hyperbola. For $a^2<\lambda$ there are no solutions. The common foci of every conic in the pencil are the points $\bigl({\pm}\sqrt{a^2 - b^2}, 0\bigr).$ This representation generalizes naturally to higher dimensions (see § Confocal quadrics).

=== Limit curves ===
As the parameter $\lambda$ approaches the value $b^2$ from below, the limit of the pencil of confocal ellipses degenerates to the line segment between foci on the x-axis (an infinitely flat ellipse). As $\lambda$ approaches $b^2$ from above, the limit of the pencil of confocal hyperbolas degenerates to the relative complement of that line segment with respect to the x-axis; that is, to the two rays with endpoints at the foci pointed outward along the x-axis (an infinitely flat hyperbola). These two limit curves have the two foci in common.

This property appears analogously in the 3-dimensional case, leading to the definition of the focal curves of confocal quadrics. See § Confocal quadrics below.

=== Twofold orthogonal system ===
Visual proof that confocal ellipses and hyperbolas intersect orthogonally, because each has a "reflection property"

Considering the pencils of confocal ellipses and hyperbolas (see lead diagram) one gets from the geometrical properties of the normal and tangent at a point (the normal of an ellipse and the tangent of a hyperbola bisect the angle between the lines to the foci). Any ellipse of the pencil intersects any hyperbola orthogonally (see diagram).

This arrangement, in which each curve in a pencil of non-intersecting curves orthogonally intersects each curve in another pencil of non-intersecting curves is sometimes called an orthogonal net. The orthogonal net of ellipses and hyperbolas is the base of an elliptic coordinate system.

== Confocal parabolas ==
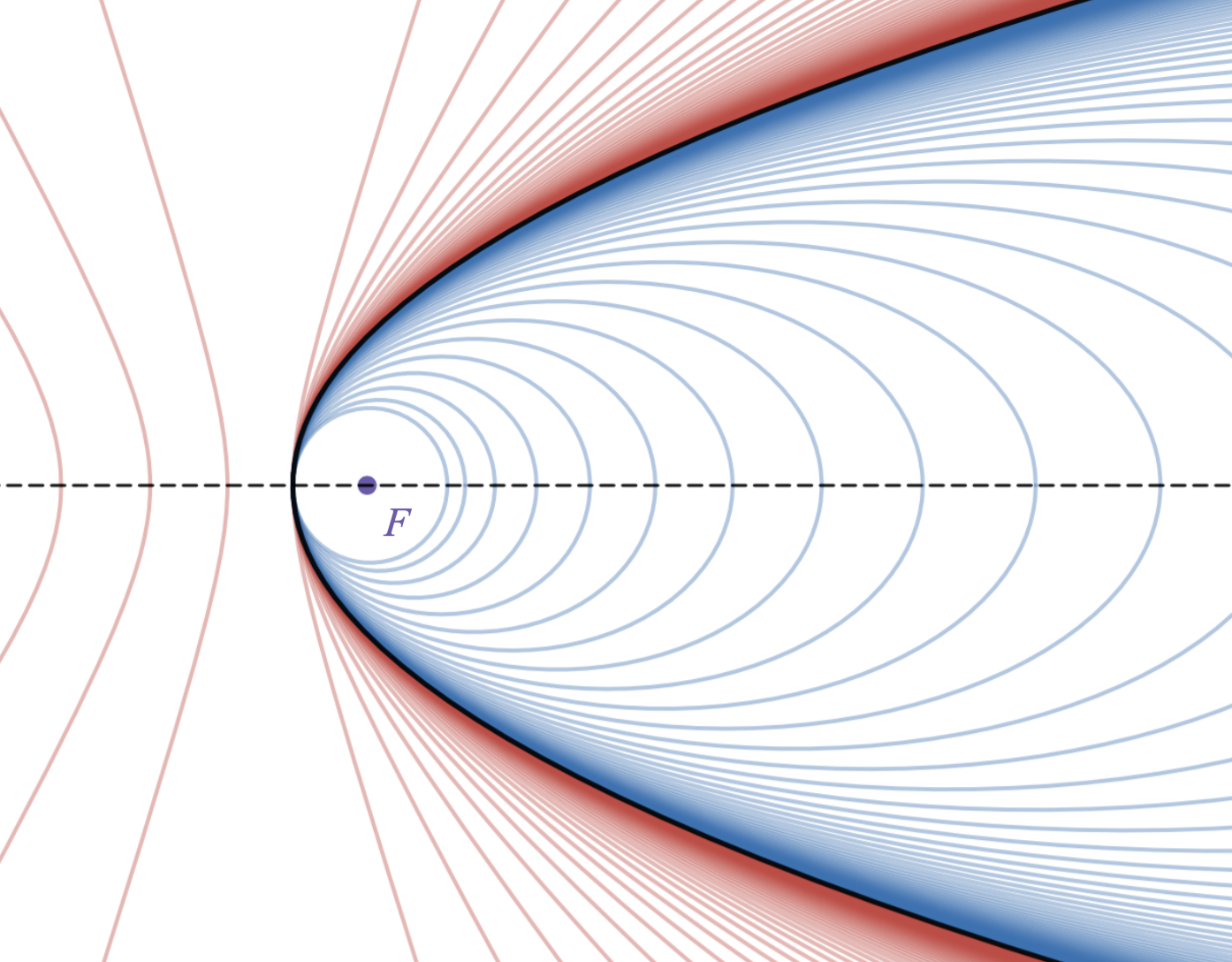
A parabola is the limit curve of a pencil of ellipses with a common vertex and one common focus, as the other focus is moved to infinity to the right, and also the limit curve of a pencil of hyperbolas with a common vertex and one common focus, as the other focus is moved to infinity to the left.

A parabola has only one focus, and can be considered as a limit curve of a set of ellipses (or a set of hyperbolas), where one focus and one vertex are kept fixed, while the second focus is moved to infinity. If this transformation is performed on each conic in an orthogonal net of confocal ellipses and hyperbolas, the limit is an orthogonal net of confocal parabolas facing opposite directions.

Every parabola with focus at the origin and x-axis as its axis of symmetry is the locus of points satisfying the equation

$$y^2 = 2xp + p^2,$$

for some value of the parameter $p,$ where $|p|$ is the semi-latus rectum. If $p > 0$ then the parabola opens to the right, and if $p < 0$ the parabola opens to the left. The point $\bigl({{-}}\tfrac12p, 0\bigr)$ is the vertex of the parabola.

Pencil of confocal parabolas

From the definition of a parabola, for any point $P$ not on the x-axis, there is a unique parabola with focus at the origin opening to the right and a unique parabola with focus at the origin opening to the left, intersecting orthogonally at the point $P$. (The parabolas are orthogonal for an analogous reason to confocal ellipses and hyperbolas: parabolas have a reflective property.)

Analogous to confocal ellipses and hyperbolas, the plane can be covered by an orthogonal net of parabolas, which can be used for a parabolic coordinate system.

The net of confocal parabolas can be considered as the image of a net of lines parallel to the coordinate axes and contained in the right half of the complex plane by the conformal map $w=z^2$ (see External links).

== Concentric circles and intersecting lines ==
A circle is an ellipse with two coinciding foci. The limit of hyperbolas as the foci are brought together is degenerate: a pair of intersecting lines.

If an orthogonal net of ellipses and hyperbolas is transformed by bringing the two foci together, the result is thus an orthogonal net of concentric circles and lines passing through the circle center. These are the basis for the polar coordinate system.

The limit of a pencil of ellipses sharing the same center and axes and passing through a given point degenerates to a pair of lines parallel with the major axis as the two foci are moved to infinity in opposite directions. Likewise the limit of an analogous pencil of hyperbolas degenerates to a pair of lines perpendicular to the major axis. Thus a rectangular grid consisting of orthogonal pencils of parallel lines is a kind of net of degenerate confocal conics. Such an orthogonal net is the basis for the Cartesian coordinate system.

== Graves's theorem ==
Construction of confocal ellipses

In 1850 the Irish bishop Charles Graves proved and published the following method for the construction of confocal ellipses with help of a string:

If one surrounds a given ellipse E by a closed string, which is longer than the given ellipse's circumference, and draws a curve similar to the gardener's construction of an ellipse (see diagram), then one gets an ellipse, that is confocal to E.

The proof of this theorem uses elliptical integrals and is contained in Klein's book. Otto Staude extended this method to the construction of confocal ellipsoids (see Klein's book).

If ellipse E collapses to a line segment $F_1F_2$, one gets a slight variation of the gardener's method drawing an ellipse with foci $F_1,F_2$.

== Confocal quadrics ==
Confocal quadrics: $a=1,\;b=0.8,\;c=0.6,\$ $\lambda_1=0.1$ (red),$\ \lambda_2=0.5$ (blue), $\lambda_3=0.8$ (purple)

Types dependent on $\lambda$

Two quadric surfaces are confocal if they share the same axes and if their intersections with each plane of symmetry are confocal conics. Analogous to conics, nondegenerate pencils of confocal quadrics come in two types: triaxial ellipsoids, hyperboloids of one sheet, and hyperboloids of two sheets; and elliptic paraboloids, hyperbolic paraboloids, and elliptic paraboloids opening in the opposite direction.

A triaxial ellipsoid with semi-axes $a,b,c$ where $a>b>c>0,$ determines a pencil of confocal quadrics. Each quadric, generated by a parameter $\lambda,$ is the locus of points satisfying the equation:

$$\frac{x^2}{a^2-\lambda}+\frac{y^2}{b^2-\lambda}+\frac{z^2}{c^2-\lambda} = 1.$$

If $\lambda<c^2$, the quadric is an ellipsoid; if $c^2<\lambda<b^2$ (in the diagram: blue), it is a hyperboloid of one sheet; if $b^2<\lambda<a^2$ it is a hyperboloid of two sheets. For $a^2<\lambda$ there are no solutions.

=== Focal curves ===
Focal conics (ellipse, hyperbola, black)

$c^2=0.36,\ b^2=0.64, \quad$ top: $\lambda=$ $0.3575$ (ellipsoid, red), $\ 0.3625$ (1s hyperb., blue), $0.638$ (1s hyperb., blue), $\ 0.642$ (2s hyperb., purple) bottom: Limit surfaces between the types

Limit surfaces for $\lambda\to c^2$:

As the parameter $\lambda$ approaches the value $c^2$ from below, the limit ellipsoid is infinitely flat, or more precisely is the area of the x-y-plane consisting of the ellipse

$$E : \frac{x^2}{a^2-c^2}+\frac{y^2}{b^2-c^2}=1$$

and its doubly covered interior (in the diagram: below, on the left, red).

As $\lambda$ approaches $c^2$ from above, the limit hyperboloid of one sheet is infinitely flat, or more precisely is the area of the x-y-plane consisting of the same ellipse $E$ and its doubly covered exterior (in the diagram: bottom, on the left, blue).

The two limit surfaces have the points of ellipse $E$ in common.

Limit surfaces for $\lambda\to b^2$:

Similarly, as $\lambda$ approaches $b^2$ from above and below, the respective limit hyperboloids (in diagram: bottom, right, blue and purple) have the hyperbola

$$H:\ \frac{x^2}{a^2-b^2}+\frac{z^2}{c^2-b^2}=1$$

in common.

Focal curves:

The foci of the ellipse $E$ are the vertices of the hyperbola $H$ and vice versa. So $E$ and $H$ are a pair of focal conics.

Reverse: Because any quadric of the pencil of confocal quadrics determined by $a,b,c$ can be constructed by a pins-and-string method (see ellipsoid) the focal conics $E,H$ play the role of infinite many foci and are called focal curves of the pencil of confocal quadrics.

=== Threefold orthogonal system ===
Analogous to the case of confocal ellipses/hyperbolas,

Any point $(x_0, y_0, z_0)\in \R^3$ with $x_0 \ne 0,\; y_0 \ne 0,\; z_0 \ne 0$ lies on exactly one surface of any of the three types of confocal quadrics.
The three quadrics through a point $(x_0, y_0, z_0)$ intersect there orthogonally (see external link).

Example for function $f(\lambda)$

Proof of the existence and uniqueness of three quadrics through a point:
For a point $(x_0,y_0,z_0)$ with $x_0\ne 0, y_0\ne 0,z_0\ne 0$ let be $f(\lambda)=\frac{x_0^2}{a^2-\lambda}+\frac{y_0^2}{b^2-\lambda}+\frac{z_0^2}{c^2-\lambda}-1$. This function has three vertical asymptotes $c^2<b^2<a^2$ and is in any of the open intervals $(-\infty,c^2),\;(c^2,b^2),\;(b^2,a^2),\;(a^2,\infty)$ a continuous and monotone increasing function. From the behaviour of the function near its vertical asymptotes and from $\lambda \to \pm \infty$ one finds (see diagram):
Function $f$ has exactly 3 zeros $\lambda_1, \lambda_2, \lambda_3$ with ${\color{red}\lambda_1}<c^2<{\color{red}\lambda_2}<b^2<{\color{red}\lambda_3}<a^2\ .$

Proof of the orthogonality of the surfaces:
Using the pencils of functions $F_\lambda(x,y,z)=\frac{x^2}{a^2-\lambda}+\frac{y^2}{b^2-\lambda}+\frac{z^2}{c^2-\lambda}$ with parameter $\lambda$ the confocal quadrics can be described by $F_\lambda(x,y,z)=1$. For any two intersecting quadrics with $F_{\lambda_i}(x,y,z)=1,\; F_{\lambda_k}(x,y,z)=1$ one gets at a common point $(x,y,z)$

$$0=F_{\lambda_i}(x,y,z) - F_{\lambda_k}(x,y,z)= \dotsb$$
$$\ =(\lambda_i-\lambda_k)\left(\frac{x^2}{(a^2-\lambda_i)(a^2-\lambda_k)}+\frac{y^2}{(b^2-\lambda_i)(b^2-\lambda_k)}+\frac{z^2}{(c^2-\lambda_i)(c^2-\lambda_k)}\right)\ .$$

From this equation one gets for the scalar product of the gradients at a common point

$$\operatorname{grad} F_{\lambda_i}\cdot \operatorname{grad} F_{\lambda_k}=4\;\left(\frac{x^2}{(a^2-\lambda_i)(a^2-\lambda_k)}+\frac{y^2}{(b^2-\lambda_i)(b^2-\lambda_k)}+\frac{z^2}{(c^2-\lambda_i)(c^2-\lambda_k)}\right)=0\ ,$$

which proves the orthogonality.

Ellipsoid with lines of curvature as intersection curves with confocal hyperboloids $a=1, \; b=0.8, \; c=0.6$

Applications:
Due to Dupin's theorem on threefold orthogonal systems of surfaces, the intersection curve of any two confocal quadrics is a line of curvature. Analogously to the planar elliptic coordinates there exist ellipsoidal coordinates.

In physics confocal ellipsoids appear as equipotential surfaces of a charged ellipsoid.

== Ivory's theorem ==
Ivory's theorem

Ivory's theorem (or Ivory's lemma), named after the Scottish mathematician and astronomer James Ivory (1765–1842), is a statement on the diagonals of a net-rectangle, a quadrangle formed by orthogonal curves:

For any net-rectangle, which is formed by two confocal ellipses and two confocal hyperbolas with the same foci, the diagonals have equal length (see diagram).

Intersection points of an ellipse and a confocal hyperbola:
Let $E(a)$ be the ellipse with the foci $F_1=(c,0),\; F_2=(-c,0)$ and the equation

$$\frac{x^2}{a^2}+\frac{y^2}{a^2-c^2}=1 \ , \quad a>c>0 \$$

and $H(u)$ the confocal hyperbola with equation

$$\frac{x^2}{u^2}+\frac{y^2}{u^2-c^2}=1 \ , \quad c>u \ .$$

Computing the intersection points of $E(a)$ and $H(u)$ one gets the four points:

$$\left(\pm \frac{au}c,\; \pm \frac{\sqrt{(a^2-c^2)(c^2-u^2)}}c\right)$$

Diagonals of a net-rectangle:
To simplify the calculation, let $c=1$ without loss of generality (any other confocal net can be obtained by uniform scaling) and among the four intersections between an ellipse and a hyperbola choose those in the positive quadrant (other sign combinations yield the same result after an analogous calculation).

Let be $E(a_1), E(a_2)$ two confocal ellipses and $H(u_1), H(u_2)$ two confocal hyperbolas with the same foci. The diagonals of the four points of the net-rectangle consisting of the points

$$\begin{align}
P_{11}&=\left(a_1u_1,\; \sqrt{(a_1^2-1)(1-u_1^2)}\right), &
P_{22}&=\left(a_2u_2,\; \sqrt{(a_2^2-1)(1-u_2^2)}\right), \\[5mu]
P_{12}&=\left(a_1u_2,\; \sqrt{(a_1^2-1)(1-u_2^2)}\right), &
P_{21}&=\left(a_2u_1,\; \sqrt{(a_2^2-1)(1-u_1^2)}\right)
\end{align}$$

are:

$$\begin{align}
|P_{11}P_{22}|^2 &= (a_2u_2-a_1u_1)^2+\left(\sqrt{(a_2^2-1)(1-u_2^2)}-\sqrt{(a_1^2-1)(1-u_1^2)}\right)^2 \\[5mu]
&= a_1^2+a_2^2+u_1^2+u_2^2 - 2\left(1+a_1a_2u_1u_2+\sqrt{(a_1^2-1)(a_2^2-1)(1-u_1^2)(1-u_2^2)}\right)
\end{align}$$

The last expression is invariant under the exchange $u_1\leftrightarrow u_2$. Exactly this exchange leads to $|P_{1\color{red}2}P_{2\color{red}1}|^2$. Hence $|P_{11}P_{22}|=|P_{12}P_{21}|$

The proof of the statement for confocal parabolas is a simple calculation.

Ivory even proved the 3-dimensional version of his theorem (s. Blaschke, p. 111):

For a 3-dimensional rectangular cuboid formed by confocal quadrics the diagonals connecting opposite points have equal length.

== See also ==
- Apollonian circles
- Focaloid
