= Asymptotic curve =

Concept in differential geometry

In the differential geometry of surfaces, an asymptotic curve is a curve always tangent to an asymptotic direction of the surface (where they exist). It is sometimes called an asymptotic line, although it need not be a line.

== Definitions ==
There are several equivalent definitions for asymptotic directions, or equivalently, asymptotic curves.

- The asymptotic directions are the same as the asymptotes of the hyperbola of the Dupin indicatrix through a hyperbolic point, or the unique asymptote through a parabolic point.
- An asymptotic direction is a direction along which the normal curvature is zero: take the plane spanned by the direction and the surface's normal at that point. The curve of intersection of the plane and the surface has zero curvature at that point.
- An asymptotic curve is a curve such that, at each point, the plane tangent to the surface is an osculating plane of the curve.

== Properties ==
Asymptotic directions can only occur when the Gaussian curvature is negative (or zero).

There are two asymptotic directions through every point with negative Gaussian curvature, bisected by the principal directions. There is one or infinitely many asymptotic directions through every point with zero Gaussian curvature.

If the surface is minimal and not flat, then the asymptotic directions are orthogonal to one another (and 45 degrees with the two principal directions).

For a developable surface, the asymptotic lines are the generatrices, and them only.

If a straight line is included in a surface, then it is an asymptotic curve of the surface.

== Related notions ==
A related notion is a curvature line, which is a curve always tangent to a principal direction.
