= Dupin indicatrix =

Method for characterising the local shape of a surface

Dupin indicatrix for a hyperbolic point. You can use your imagination for the cases for parabolic points and elliptic points.

In differential geometry, the Dupin indicatrix is a method for characterising the local shape of a surface. Draw a plane parallel to the tangent plane and a small distance away from it. Consider the intersection of the surface with this plane. The shape of the intersection is related to the Gaussian curvature. The Dupin indicatrix is the result of the limiting process as the plane approaches the tangent plane. The indicatrix was introduced by Charles Dupin.

Equivalently, one can construct the Dupin indicatrix at point p, by first rotating and translating the surface, so that p is at origin, and the tangent plane is the xy-plane. Now the contour plot of the surface are the Dupin indicatrices.

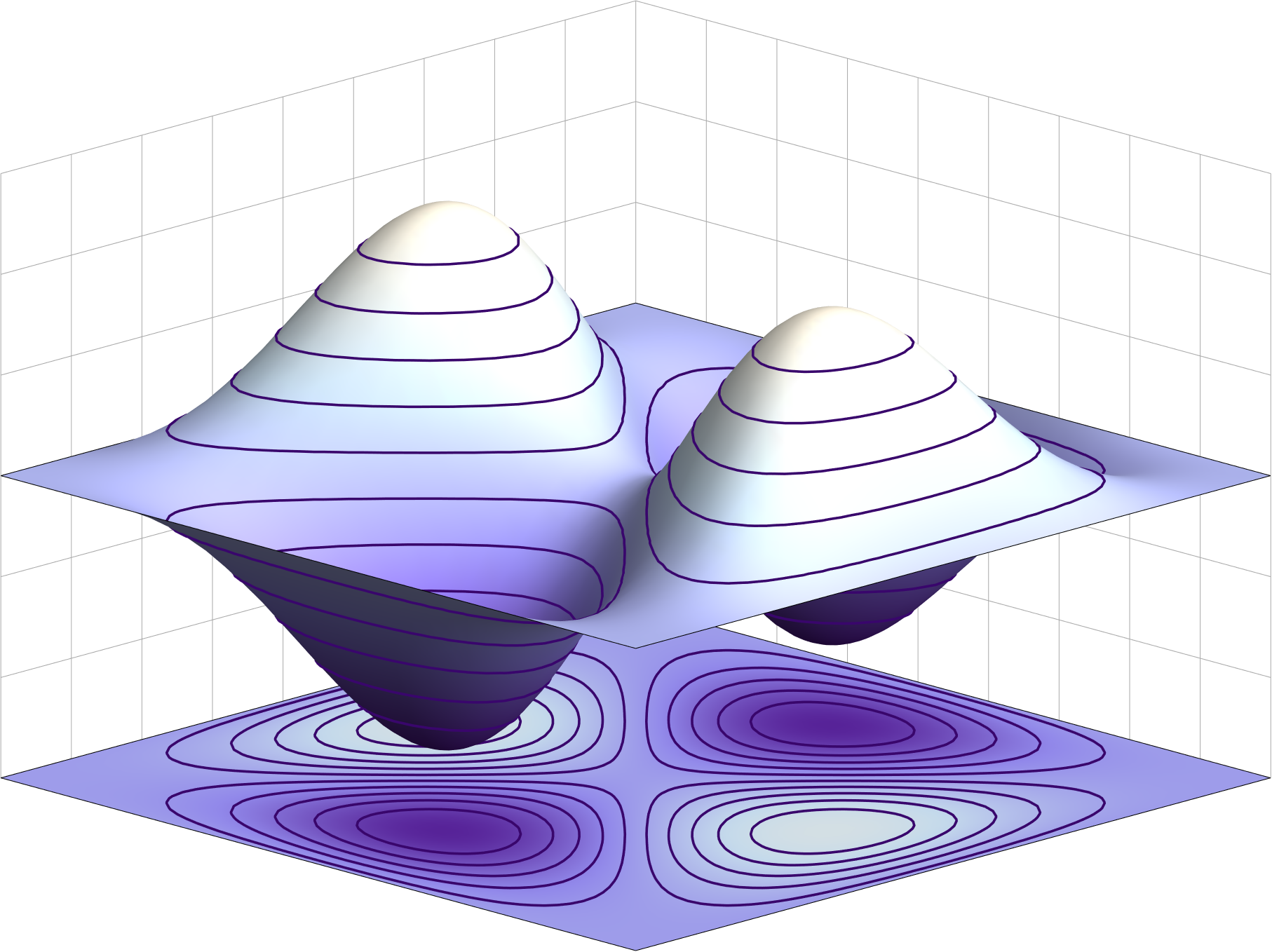
In this picture, we see 5 Dupin indicatrices. Four are elliptical (two for the peaks, two for the basins, but the peaks and the basins are both elliptical points), and one is hyperbolic (the "mountain pass" in the center).

== Classification ==
For elliptical points where the Gaussian curvature is positive the intersection will either be empty or form a closed curve. In the limit this curve will form an ellipse aligned with the principal directions. The curvature lines make up the major and minor axes of the ellipse.

In particular, the indicatrix of an umbilical point is a circle.

For hyperbolic points, where the Gaussian curvature is negative, the intersection will form a hyperbola. Two different hyperbolas will be formed on either side of the tangent plane. These hyperbolas share the same axis and asymptotes. The directions of the asymptotes are the same as the asymptotic directions.

In particular, the indicatrix of each point on a minimal surface is two lines intersecting at right angles, which each make a 45-degree angle with the two curvature lines.

For parabolic points, where the Gaussian curvature is zero, the intersection will form two parallel lines. The direction of those two lines are the same as the asymptotic directions.

In particular, the indicatrix of each point on a developable surface is a pair of lines parallel to the generatrix.

For more complex cases where all the second-degree derivatives are zero, but higher-degree derivatives are nonzero, the Dupin indicatrix is more complex. For example, the monkey saddle has Dupin indicatrix in the shape of six-pointed hyperbola.

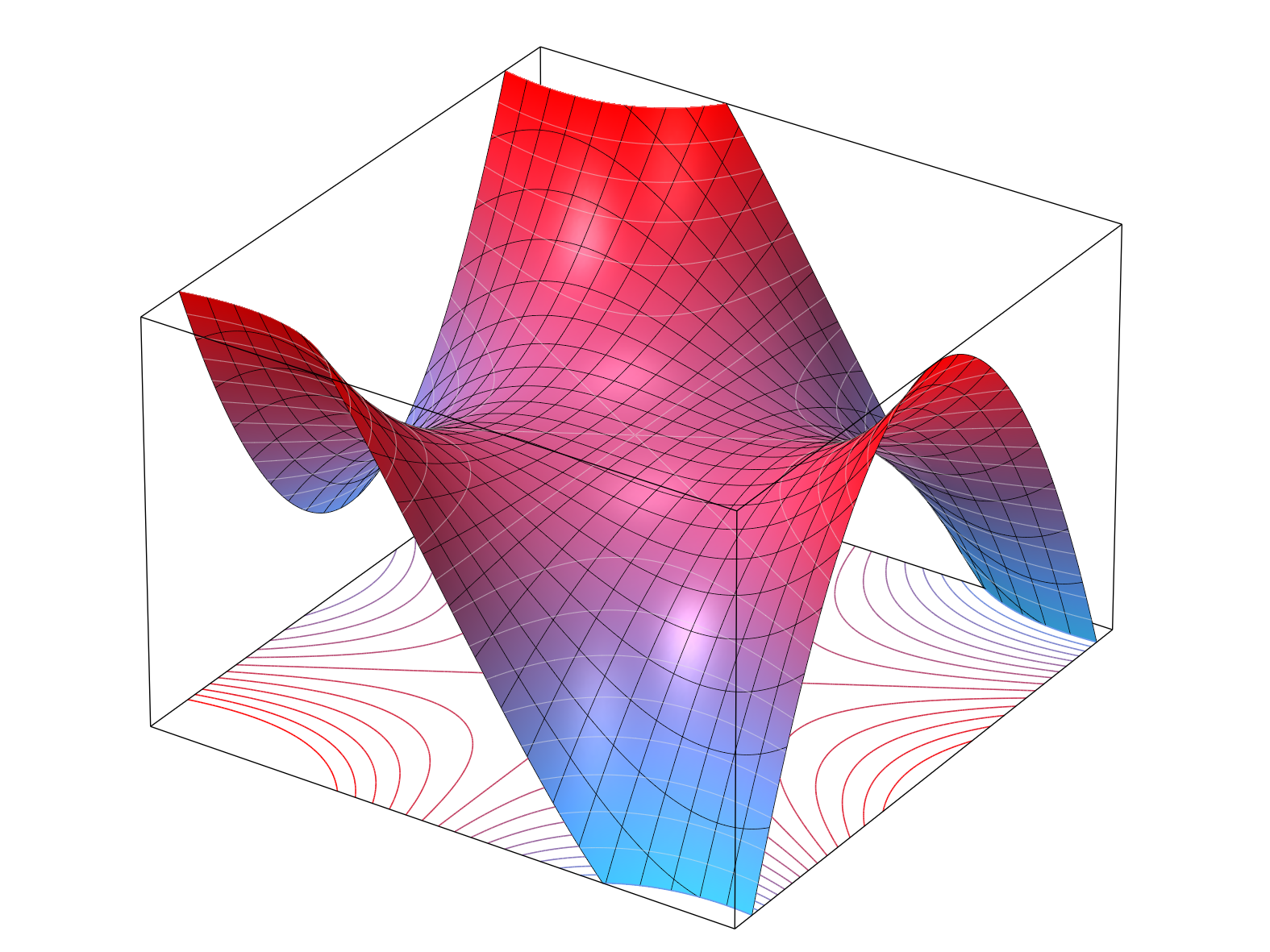
The monkey saddle has a six-pointed hyperbola as a Dupin indicatrix.

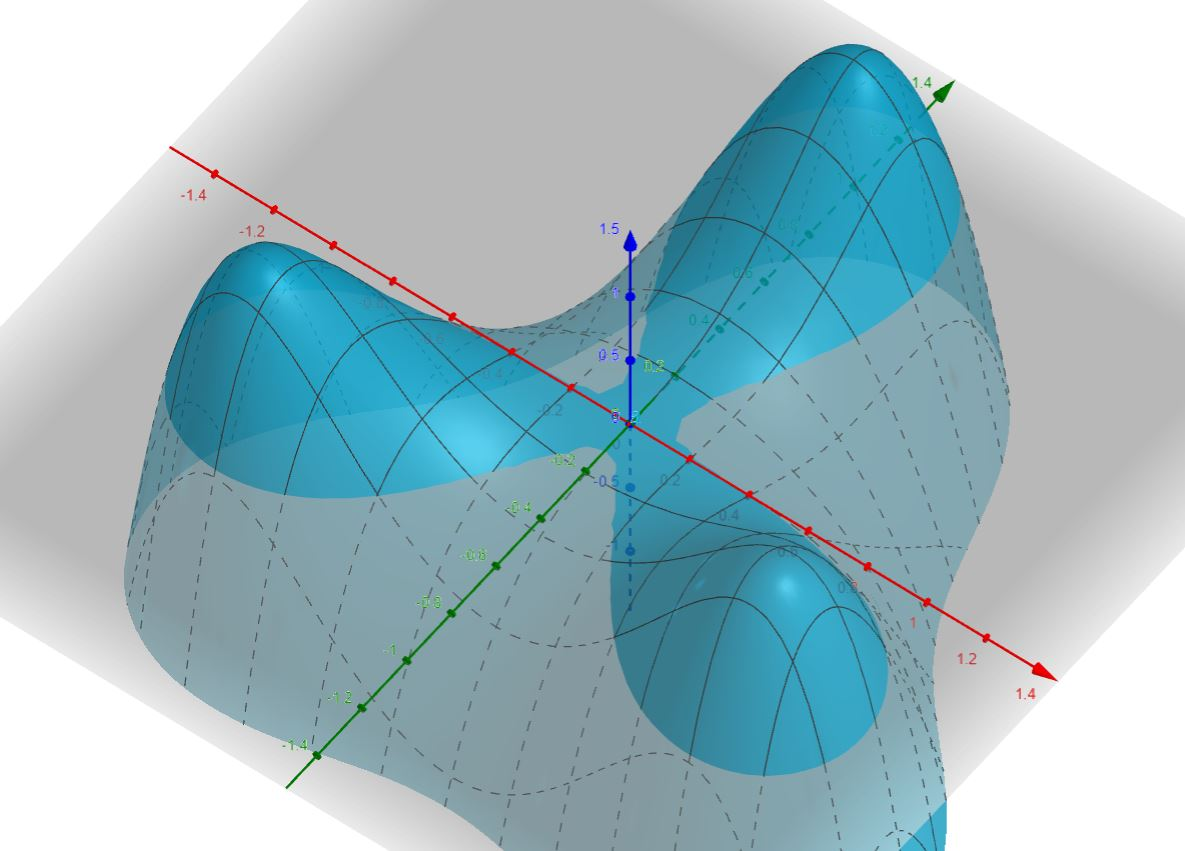
Another view of a monkey saddle, this time showing the intersection of the plane with the saddle, and their intersection -- the Dupin indicatrix. Note that this monkey saddle is somewhat unconventional, as it has three "peaks", though it would make for a more comfortable saddle, it does not change the overall shape of the Dupin indicatrix.

== See also ==
- Euler's theorem (differential geometry)
