= Chasles' theorem (gravity) =

In gravitation, Chasles' theorem says that the Newtonian gravitational attraction of a spherical shell, outside of that shell, is equivalent mathematically to the attraction of a point mass. The theorem is conventionally known as Newton's shell theorem, but is attributed to Michel Chasles (1793–1880) by Benjamin Peirce.

Benjamin Peirce followed Chasles work on that developed an analogy between conduction of heat and gravitational attraction:

A single current in a direction perpendicular to the level surfaces, and having a velocity proportionate to the decrease in density … is the law of propagation of heat, when there is no radiation, and hence arise the analogies between the levels and isothermal surfaces, and the identity of the mathematical investigations of the attraction of bodies and the propagation of heat which have been developed by Chasles.

The Chaslesian shell is the figure that Peirce exploits:

If an infinitely thin homogeneous shell is formed upon each level surface, of a system of bodies, having at each point a thickness proportional to the attraction at that point, the portion of either of these shells, which is included in a canal formed by trajectories, bears the same ratio to the whole shell, which the portion of another shell included in the same canal bears to that shell, provided there is no mass included between the shells.
The conception of these shells, and the investigation of their acting and reacting properties was original with Chasles, and it will be convenient, as it is appropriate, to designated them as Chaslesian shells.

Chasles' theorem as expressed by Peirce:

The external level surfaces of a shell are the same with those of the original masses, and the attraction of the shell upon an external point has the same direction with the attraction of the original masses, and is normal to the level surface passing through the point. This theorem is due to Chasles.

The ellipsoid is recruited to bound the Chaslesian shells:

An infinitely thin homogeneous shell, of which the inner and outer surfaces are those of similar, and similarly placed, concentric ellipsoids, is a Chaslesian shell.

== See also ==
- Newton's shell theorem
