= Homoeoid and focaloid =

Geometric shell bounded by two concentric, similar ellipses or ellipsoids

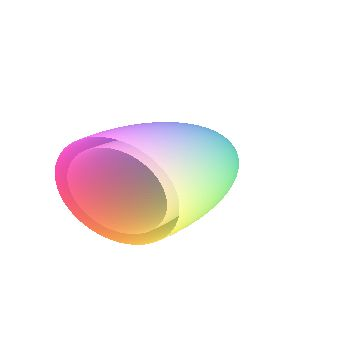
Cut view of a homoeoid in 3D

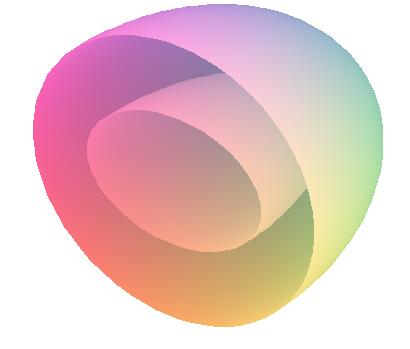
Cut view of a focaloid in 3D

A homoeoid or homeoid is a shell (a bounded region) bounded by two concentric, similar ellipses (in 2D) or ellipsoids (in 3D). When the thickness of the shell becomes negligible, it is called a thin homoeoid. The name homoeoid was coined by Lord Kelvin and Peter Tait. Closely related is the focaloid, a shell between concentric, confocal ellipses or ellipsoids.

== Mathematical definition ==
If the outer shell is given by

$$\frac{x^2}{a^2} + \frac{y^2}{b^2} + \frac{z^2}{c^2} = 1$$

with semiaxes $a,b,c$, the inner shell of a homoeoid is given for $0 \leq m \leq 1$ by

$$\frac{x^2}{a^2} + \frac{y^2}{b^2} + \frac{z^2}{c^2} = m^2,\quad {\displaystyle {\frac{x^2}{a^2 + \lambda }}+{\frac{y^2}{b^2 + \lambda }}+{\frac{z^2}{c^2 + \lambda }}=1.}$$

and a focaloid is defined for $\lambda \geq 0$ by

$$\frac{x^2}{a^2 + \lambda} + \frac{y^2}{b^2 + \lambda} + \frac{z^2}{c^2 + \lambda} = 1.$$

The thin homoeoid is then given by the limit $m \to 1$, and the thin focaloid is the limit $\lambda \to 0$.

== Physical properties ==
Thin focaloids and homoeoids can be used as elements of an ellipsoidal matter or charge distribution that generalize the shell theorem for spherical shells. The gravitational or electromagnetic potential of a homoeoid homogeneously filled with matter or charge is constant inside the shell, so there is no force on a test particle inside of it. Meanwhile, two uniform, concentric focaloids with the same mass or charge exert the same potential on a test particle outside of both.
