= Dupin hypersurface =

Type of hypersurface in differential geometry

In differential geometry, a Dupin hypersurface is a submanifold in a space form, whose principal curvatures have globally constant multiplicities.

== Application ==
A hypersurface is called a Dupin hypersurface if the multiplicity of each principal curvature is constant on hypersurface and each principal curvature is constant along its associated principal directions. All proper Dupin submanifolds arise as focal submanifolds of proper Dupin hypersurfaces.
