= Confocal =

In geometry, confocal means having the same foci: confocal conic sections.

- For an optical cavity consisting of two mirrors, confocal means that they share their foci. If they are identical mirrors, their radius of curvature, R_{mirror}, equals L, where L is the distance between the mirrors.
- In conic sections, it is said of two ellipses, two hyperbolas, or an ellipse and a hyperbola which share both foci with each other. If an ellipse and a hyperbola are confocal, they are perpendicular to each other.
- In optics, it means that one focus or image point of one lens is the same as one focus of the next lens.

== See also ==
- Confocal laser scanning microscopy
- Confocal microscopy
- List of orbits § Eccentricity classifications
