= Nobuyuki =

- Gender: Male

Origin
- Origin: Japanese
- Meaning: Different meanings depending on the kanji used

Nobuyuki (written: 信行, 信之, 信幸, 信順, 信孝, 修之, 伸行, 伸之, 伸幸, 宣之, 誠行, 展之 or 演之) is a masculine Japanese given name. Notable people with the name include:

- Nobuyuki Abe (阿部 信行; 1875–1953), Japanese general, politician and Prime Minister of Japan
- Nobuyuki Abe (footballer) (阿部 伸行; born 1984), Japanese footballer
- Nobuyuki Aihara (相原 信行; 1934–2013), Japanese gymnast
- Nobuyuki Anzai (安西 信行; born 1972), Japanese manga artist
- Nobuyuki Azuma (東 伸行; born 1959), Japanese fencer
- Nobuyuki Daishi (大至 伸行; born 1968), Japanese sumo wrestler
- Nobuyuki Ebisu (戎 信行; born 1972), Japanese baseball player
- Nobuyuki Fukumoto (福本 伸行; born 1958), Japanese manga artist
- Nobuyuki Hiyama (檜山 修之; born 1967), Japanese voice actor
- Nobuyuki Hosaka (保坂 信之; born 1970), Japanese footballer
- Nobuyuki Idei (出井 伸之; born 1937), Japanese chief executive
- Nobuyuki Iida (飯田 誠行; born 1945), Japanese handball player
- Nobuyuki Inoue (井上 信行), Japanese video game developer
- Nobuyuki Kajitani (梶谷 信之; born 1955), Japanese gymnast
- Nobuyuki Kato (加藤 信幸; born 1920), Japanese footballer
- Nobuyuki Katsube (勝部 演之; born 1938), Japanese actor and voice actor
- Nobuyuki Kobushi (小伏 伸之; born 1974), Japanese voice actor
- Nobuyuki Kojima (小島 伸幸; born 1966), Japanese footballer
- Nobuyuki Nanbu (南部 信順; 1814 –1872), Japanese daimyō
- Nobuyuki Nishi (西 伸幸; born 1985), Japanese freestyle skier
- Nobuyuki Oda (織田 信行; 1536–1557), Japanese samurai
- Nobuyuki Oishi (大石 信幸; born 1930), Japanese footballer
- Nobuyuki Otsu (大津 展之), Japanese engineer
- Nobuyuki Sanada (真田 信之; 1566–1658), Japanese samurai and daimyō
- Nobuyuki Sato (佐藤 信之; born 1972), Japanese marathon runner
- Nobuyuki Suzuki (鈴木 伸之; born 1992), Japanese actor
- Nobuyuki Suzuki (actor, born 1963) (鈴木 伸幸; born 1963), Japanese actor
- Nobuyuki Takagi (高木 信孝; born 1968), Japanese manga artist
- Nobuyuki Tanaka (田中 伸幸; born 1971), Japanese botanist
- Nobuyuki Tsugaru (津軽 信順; 1800–1862), Japanese daimyō
- Nobuyuki Tsujii (辻井 伸行; born 1988), Japanese pianist and composer
- Nobuyuki Yashiki (屋敷 伸之; born 1972), Japanese shogi player
- Nobuyuki Zaizen (財前 宣之; born 1976), Japanese footballer

== Fictional characters ==
- Sugō Nobuyuki (須郷 伸之), a character in the light novel series Sword Art Online

== See also ==
- 27716 Nobuyuki, a main-belt asteroid
