= Circular thresholding =

Algorithm in image processing

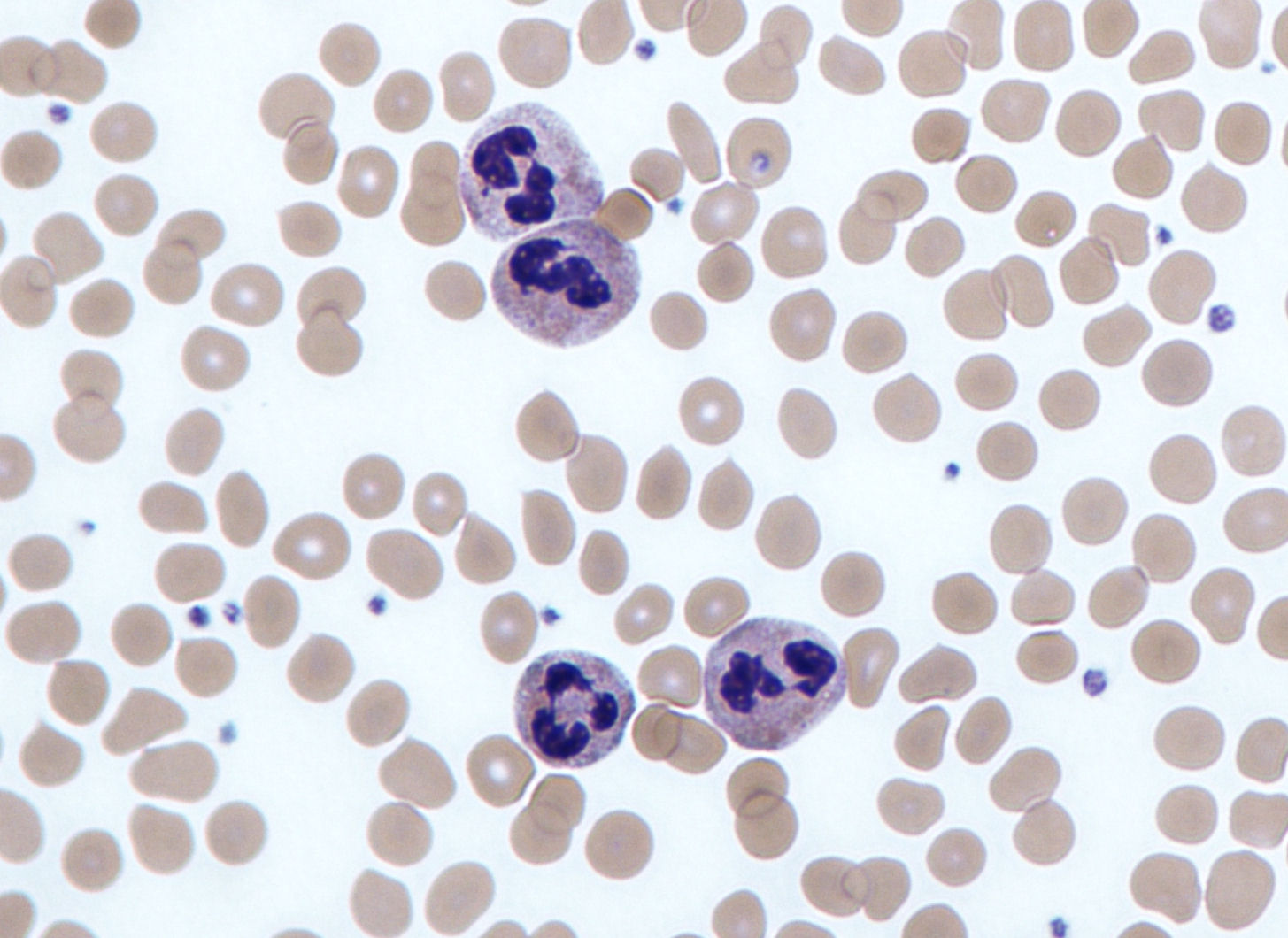
Original image: neutrophil white blood cells (leukocytes)

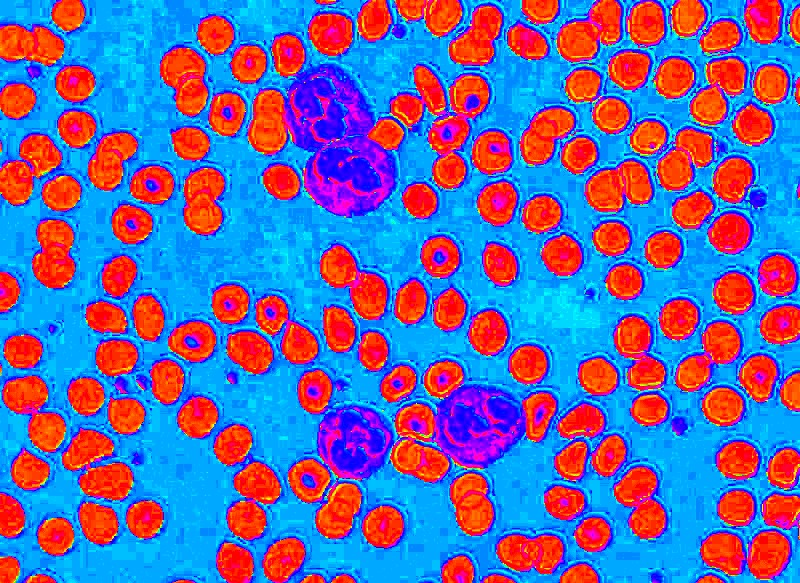
Hue component

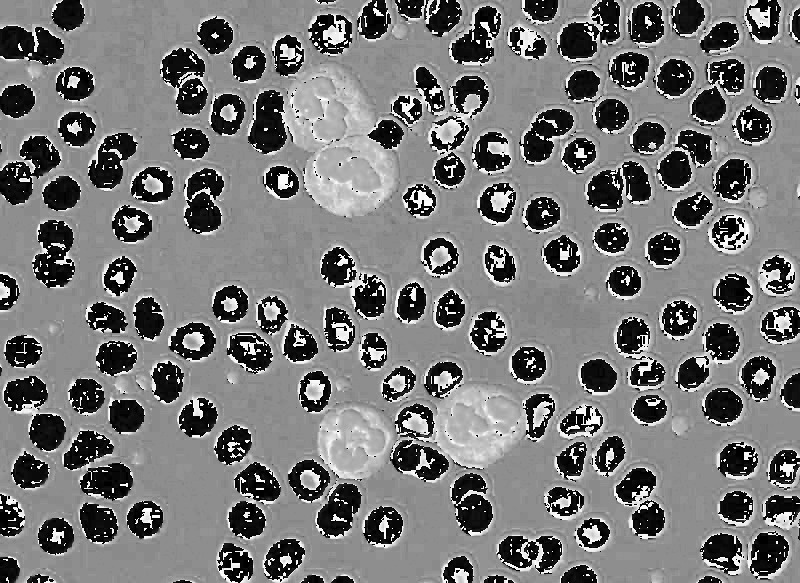
Hue component shown as intensity image

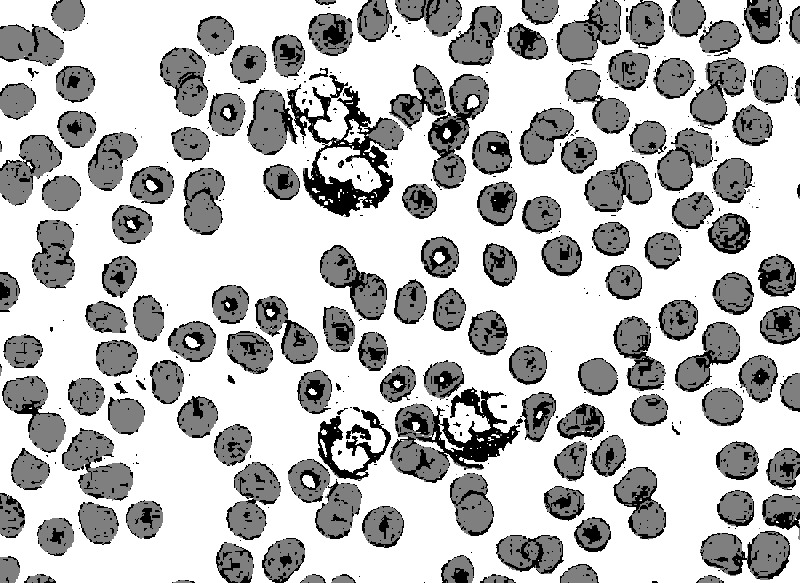
Hue component thresholded with linear version of Otsu's algorithm

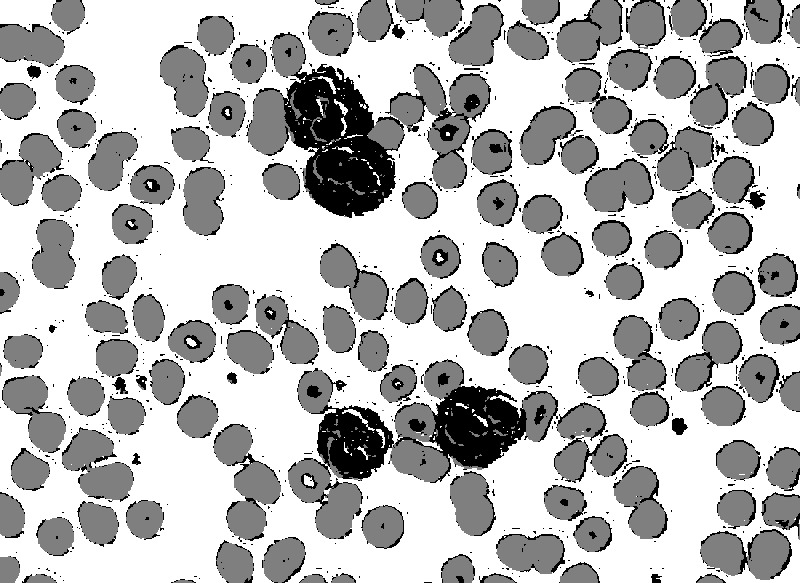
Hue component thresholded with circular version of Otsu's algorithm

Circular thresholding is an algorithm for automatic image threshold selection in image processing. Most threshold selection algorithms assume that the values (e.g. intensities) lie on a linear scale. However, some quantities such as hue and orientation are a circular quantity, and therefore require circular thresholding algorithms. The example shows that the standard linear version of Otsu's method when applied to the hue channel of an image of blood cells fails to correctly segment the large white blood cells (leukocytes). In contrast the white blood cells are correctly segmented by the circular version of Otsu's method.

== Methods ==
There are a relatively small number of circular image threshold selection algorithms. The following examples are all based on Otsu's method for linear histograms:

- (Tseng, Li and Tung 1995) smooth the circular histogram, and apply Otsu's method. The histogram is cyclically rotated so that the selected threshold is shifted to zero. Otsu's method and histogram rotation are applied iteratively until several heuristics involving class size, threshold location, and class variance are satisfied.
- (Wu et al. 2006) smooth the circular histogram until it contains only two peaks. The histogram is cyclically rotated so that the midpoint between the peaks is shifted to zero. Otsu's method and histogram rotation are applied iteratively until convergence of the threshold.
- (Lai and Rosin 2014) applied Otsu's method to the circular histogram. For the two class circular thresholding task they showed that, for a histogram with an even number of bins, the optimal solution for Otsu's criterion of within-class variance is obtained when the histogram is split into two halves. Therefore the optimal solution can be efficiently obtained in linear rather than quadratic time.

== References and further reading ==
- D.-C. Tseng, Y.-F. Li, and C.-T. Tung, Circular histogram thresholding for color image segmentation in Proc. Int. Conf. Document Anal. Recognit., 1995, pp. 673–676.
- J. Wu, P. Zeng, Y. Zhou, and C. Olivier, A novel color image segmentation method and its application to white blood cell image analysis in Proc. Int. Conf. Signal Process., vol. 2. 2006, pp. 16–20.
- Y.K. Lai, P.L. Rosin, Efficient Circular Thresholding, IEEE Trans. on Image Processing 23(3), 992–1001 (2014). doi:10.1109/TIP.2013.2297014
