= Ōtsu (disambiguation) =

Ōtsu is the capital city of Shiga Prefecture, Japan

Ōtsu may also refer to:

- Ōtsu Station, a railway station in Ōtsu, Shiga, Japan
- Ōtsu District, Yamaguchi, a former district in Yamaguchi Prefecture, Japan
- Ōtsu (surname), a Japanese surname
- Ōtsu-juku, a station of the Nakasendō and the Tōkaidō
- Prince Ōtsu, a Japanese poet and the son of Emperor Tenmu
- Otsu, a variant of the Type 89 I-Go medium tank
