= George F. Jenks =

American geographer and cartographer

- Born: George Frederick Jenks; July 16, 1916; Oneonta, New York, U.S.
- Died: December 29, 1996 (aged 80)
- Occupation: Geographer
- Known for: Jenks natural breaks optimization

Academic background
- Education: New York State College for Teachers (BEd); Syracuse University (MA, PhD)
- Thesis: New Land Development in the Rice Economy of the Weiner Area, Arkansas

Academic work
- Discipline: Geography
- Sub-discipline: Agricultural geography, Cartography
- Institutions: University of Arkansas; University of Kansas

George Frederick Jenks (July 16, 1916 – December 29, 1996) was an American geographer known for his significant contributions to cartography and geographic information systems (GIS). With a career spanning over three decades, Jenks played a vital role in advancing map-making technologies, was instrumental in enhancing the visualization of spatial data, and played foundational roles in developing modern cartographic curricula. The Jenks natural breaks optimization, based on his work, is still widely used in the creation of thematic maps, such as choropleth maps.

== Education and field ==
George F. Jenks earned his B.S.Ed. in 1941 from the New York State College for Teachers (now University at Albany). He earned both his M.S. and Ph.D. in geography from Syracuse University in 1947 and 1950 respectively. Jenks initially focused his research on agricultural geography which formed the subject of both his master's thesis and doctoral dissertation, with his dissertation being titled "New Land Development in the Rice Economy of the Weiner Area, Arkansas." After being exposed to Richard Edes Harrison as a cartography instructor, Jenks shifted towards researching cartography. This interest led Jenks to become one of the most influential cartographic researchers of the 20th century.

== Career ==
=== Military ===
Branch insignia of the Army Air Corps

Jenks joined the United States Army Air Corps in 1941 after graduating with his bachelor's degree. During World War II, he served as an instructor of aerial navigation, holding the highest rank of First lieutenant. Jenk's time as an instructor of aerial navigation inspired him to pursue a career in geography.

=== Academic ===
After his time in the military, Jenks went to graduate school at Syracuse University to study geography. After graduating from Syracuse University, Jenks's first position was at the Department of Rural Economics and Sociology at the University of Arkansas. In 1949, Jenks took a position in the Geography Department at the University of Kansas. Here, Jenks would grow the cartography program within the University of Kansas department of geography into one of the most influential in the country. Throughout his career, Jenks advocated for improved curriculums for cartographers and a greater focus on the science of applied mapping. Jenks retired from the University of Kansas in 1986.

While Jenks publications and research were highly influential, he is noted to have focused much of his energy on helping his graduate students. These students carried his influence into other geography departments across the United States, shaping how cartographic training is accomplished. He continued to work with graduate students at the University of Kansas even after his retirement in 1986.

== Research and Publications ==
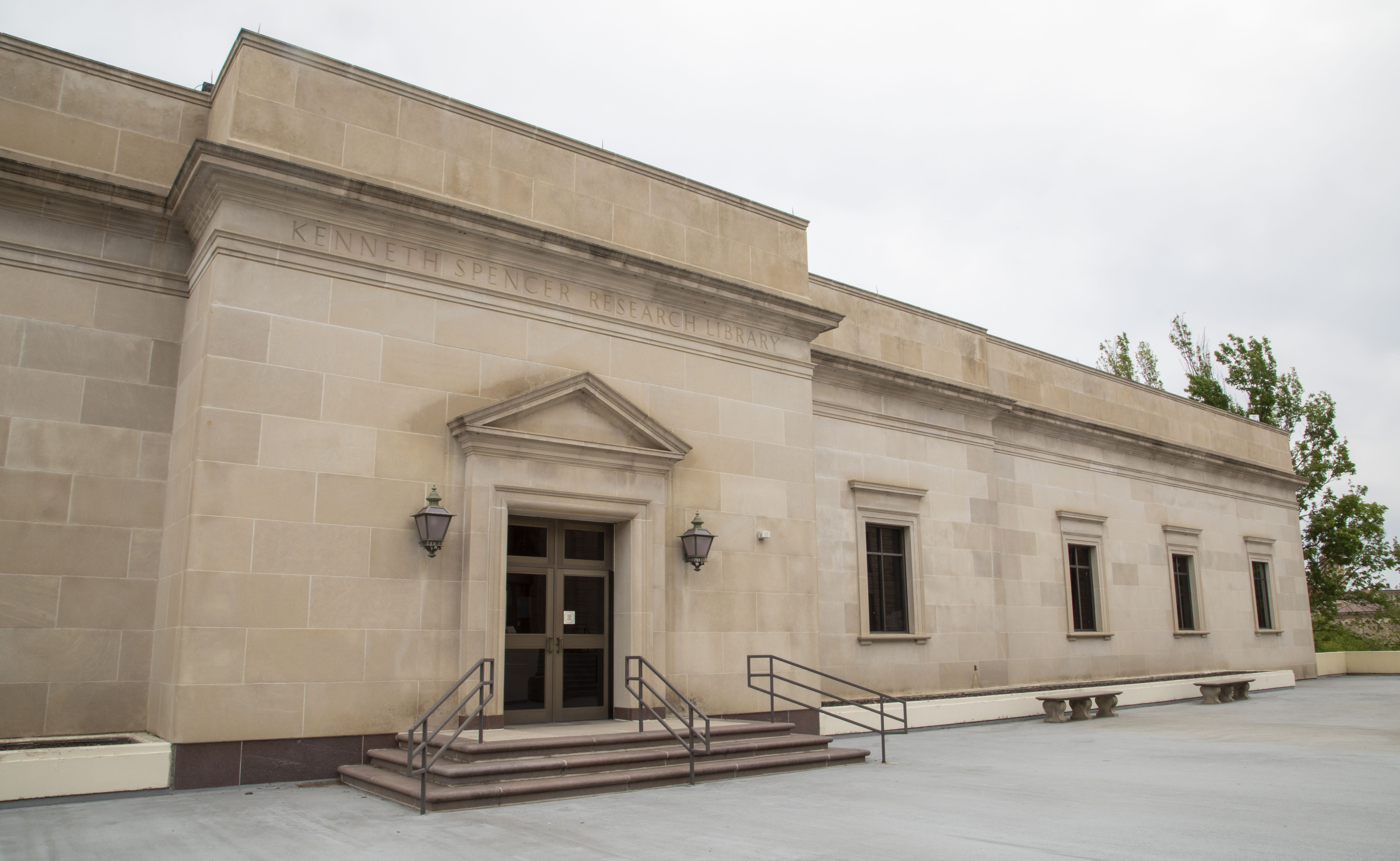
Main Entrance of the Kenneth Spencer Research Library, University of Kansas, Lawrence, Kansas

Jenks early publications focus on his interest in agricultural geography. After receiving a grant award from the Fund for the Advancement of Science, Jenks research shifted towards improving cartography, both in terms of map production and training of cartographers. This led to decades of publications focused on human error introduced into maps by cartographers, generalization introduced during the mapping process, eye movement, three-dimensional mapping, geostatistics, and thematic mapping in general. As the concept of computer cartography was only introduced in 1959 by Waldo Tobler, Jenks publications were extremely influential in laying the foundation for GIS, thematic mapping, and modern cartography. The Kenneth Spencer Research Library at the University of Kansas maintains the "Personal Papers of George F. Jenks" and "George F. Jenks Map Collection."

=== Jenks natural breaks optimization method ===
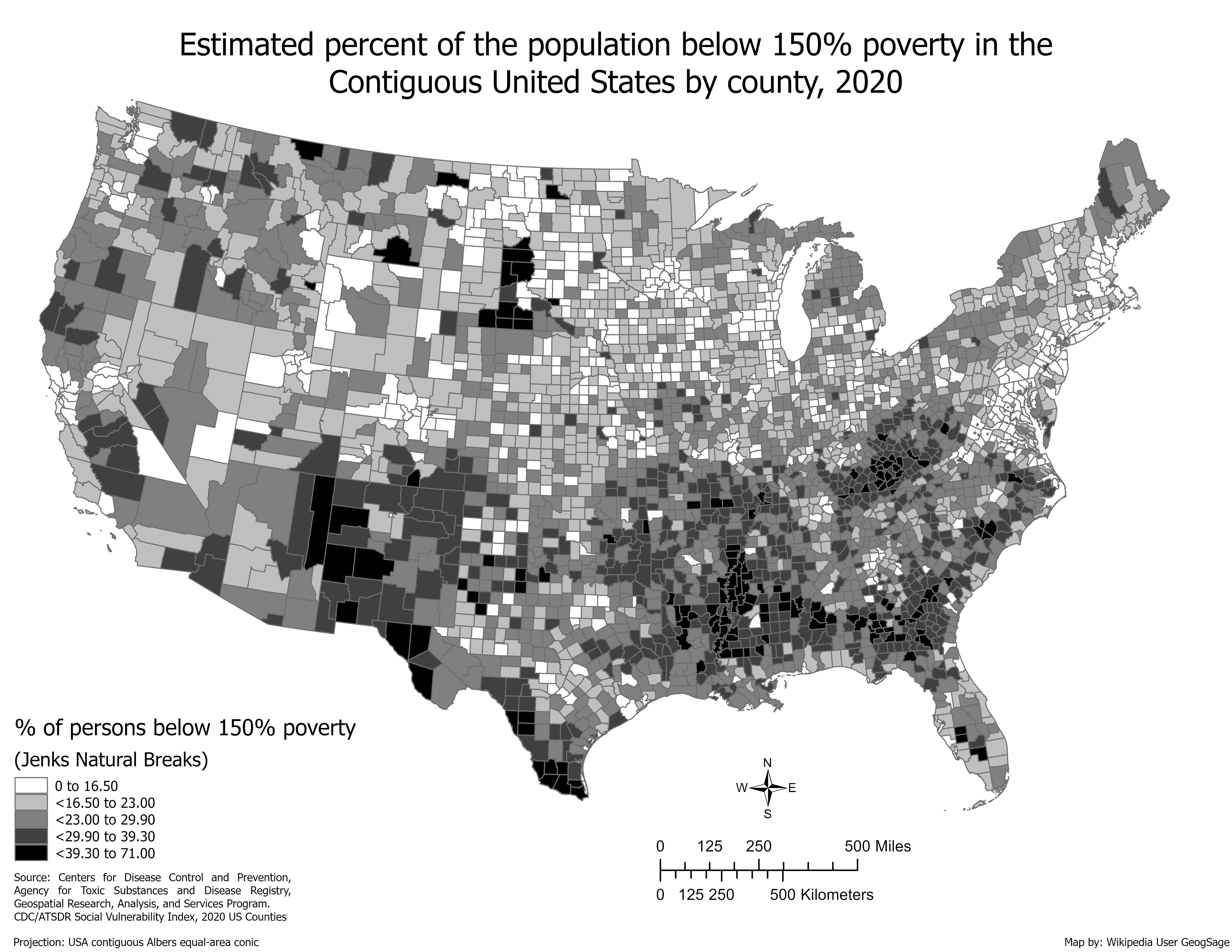
Choropleth map showing estimated percent of the population below 150% poverty in the Contiguous United States by county, 2020 that uses the Jenks natural breaks classification

One of the most influential concepts developed by Jenks in terms of applied cartography is the Jenks Natural Breaks optimization method. Jenks made a breakthrough with the development of the "Jenks Natural Breaks Optimization Algorithm," commonly known as the Jenks Natural Breaks Algorithm, in a 1967 paper. This algorithm is widely used in cartography and GIS to classify data into natural groupings, thereby enhancing the visual representation of data on maps. The algorithm optimally minimizes the variance within each group and maximizes the variance between groups, resulting in more effective data visualization. It is the default method for dividing classes in thematic maps such as choropleths in Esri software, such as ArcGIS. This method has limitations, and alternative methods for dividing classes include quantiles, standard deviation, and equal interval.

== Awards ==
- Faculty Fellowship, Fund for the Advancement of Education, 1951-52
- Citation for Meritorious Contribution to the Field of Geography, Association of American Geographers, 1952
- Honors Award for Outstanding Achievement, American Cartographic Association of the American Congress on Surveying and Mapping, 1982
- Named Fellow, the American Association for the Advancement of Science, 1987
- Master Teacher Award, National Council on Geographic Education, 1987

== See also ==
- Dot distribution map – Thematic map using dots to visualize distribution
- Arthur Getis – American geographer and spatial statistician
- Michael DeMers – American geographer and fiction writer
- Otsu's Method – In computer vision and image processing
- Quantitative revolution – Paradigm shift in geography
- Roger Tomlinson – English-Canadian geographer
