= Ōtsu (surname) =

Ōtsu, Otsu, Ootsu or Ohtsu (written: 大津) is a Japanese surname. Notable people with the surname include:

- Hiromi Ōtsu (大津 広美, born 1984), Japanese speed skater
- Nobuyuki Otsu (大津 展之), Japanese engineer
- Shinji Otsu (大津 真二, born 1961), Japanese sailor
- Toshio Ōtsu (大津 敏男, 1893–1958), last Director of the Karafuto Agency
- Yūki Ōtsu (大津 祐樹, born 1990), Japanese footballer
