= Polycentric networks =

In public policy a polycentric network is a group of distinct local, regional, or national entities that work co-operatively towards a common goal. Proponents claim that such networks can better adapt to changing issues collectively than individually, thus providing network participants better results from relevant efforts.

== Urban contexts ==
Robert Kloosterman and Bart Lambregts define polycentric urban regions as collections of historically distinct jurisdictions that are administratively and politically independent. These jurisdictions are in close proximity and well connected through infrastructure. The literature on polycentric urban regions is limited and unconsolidated, so diverse concepts exist. Evert Meijers claimed that polycentric networks are especially prominent in Europe.

Rural polycentric networks are nearly non-existent. Urban polycentric networks draw heavily on economic network theories. According to Meijers, “individual cities in these collections of distinct but proximally-located cities relate to each other in a synergistic way, making the whole network of cities more than the sum of its parts”.

== Implementation ==
Polycentric networks have different spatial characteristics, reflecting a micro, meso, or macro-level of connections in a given region. These different scales allow flexible and convertible networks for spatial planning in complex regions and systems.

- Micro-level: intra-urban or intra-regional aspects within a certain city region. The emphasis at this level is “urban functional and economic complementarities” which make “cooperation and improved links” major engines of regional economic performance and “promote integrated spatial development strategies for city clusters”.
- Meso-level: inter-metropolitan issues within a delimited area. The emphasis at this level is very similar to the micro-level, with added specialization.
- Macro-level: inter-metropolitan issues on a continental or global scale. At the macro level polycentricism is considered to be “a useful alternative model to enhance regional development more evenly across the European territory”.

== Metropolitan areas ==
In metropolitan areas, the scale and intensity of collaboration is a key determinant of whether or not polycentric networks function properly. Metropolitan planning organizations (MPOs) have given researchers a unique opportunity to study the scale and intensity of collaboration. A 2015 study of 381 MPOs in the United States, found a direct link between the MPO's scale and performance. The study concluded that more intense MPO collaboration across both vertical and horizontal stakeholders improved performance. The study found that MPOs that focused more on vertical collaboration (between the state and higher-up agencies) saw a decrease in their perceived performance. The study looked at 15 indicators including condition of transportation network, mobility for disadvantaged populations, air quality, highway congestion, public participation, extent of coordination and stakeholder involvement, satisfaction among general public, satisfaction among local stakeholders, compliance with federal and state rules, transportation systems security, accessibility, reliability, and safety, travel demand model accuracy and project implementation.

== Future polycentric networks ==
Researcher Perry Yang claimed that the future for polycentric networks lies in sustainability. Yang conducted research in Singapore around cities' push for greater sustainability. With globalization and the separation of land comes split ecosystems and habitat changes to built infrastructure for human development. A big issue for sustainability is how to minimize human environmental impact while thriving as a species.

Yang's research explored Singapore's growth over time. He noted that this growth was largely industrial and revolved around rapid mass transit (MRT), which connects areas of the island. The general shift seen in Singapore can be seen as the impact of polycentric networks throughout the island with the implementation of rezoning policies. From 1986 to 1994, much rezoning occurred due to changes in land use policy. Yang found that transit and raw materials are central to growth in rapidly developing areas and argued that Singapore is a good example of a polycentric urban form, but may not be adequate to establish an urban sustainability model.

== See also ==
- Economics of networks
- Supply chain collaboration
