= Map =

Symbolic depiction of spatial relationships

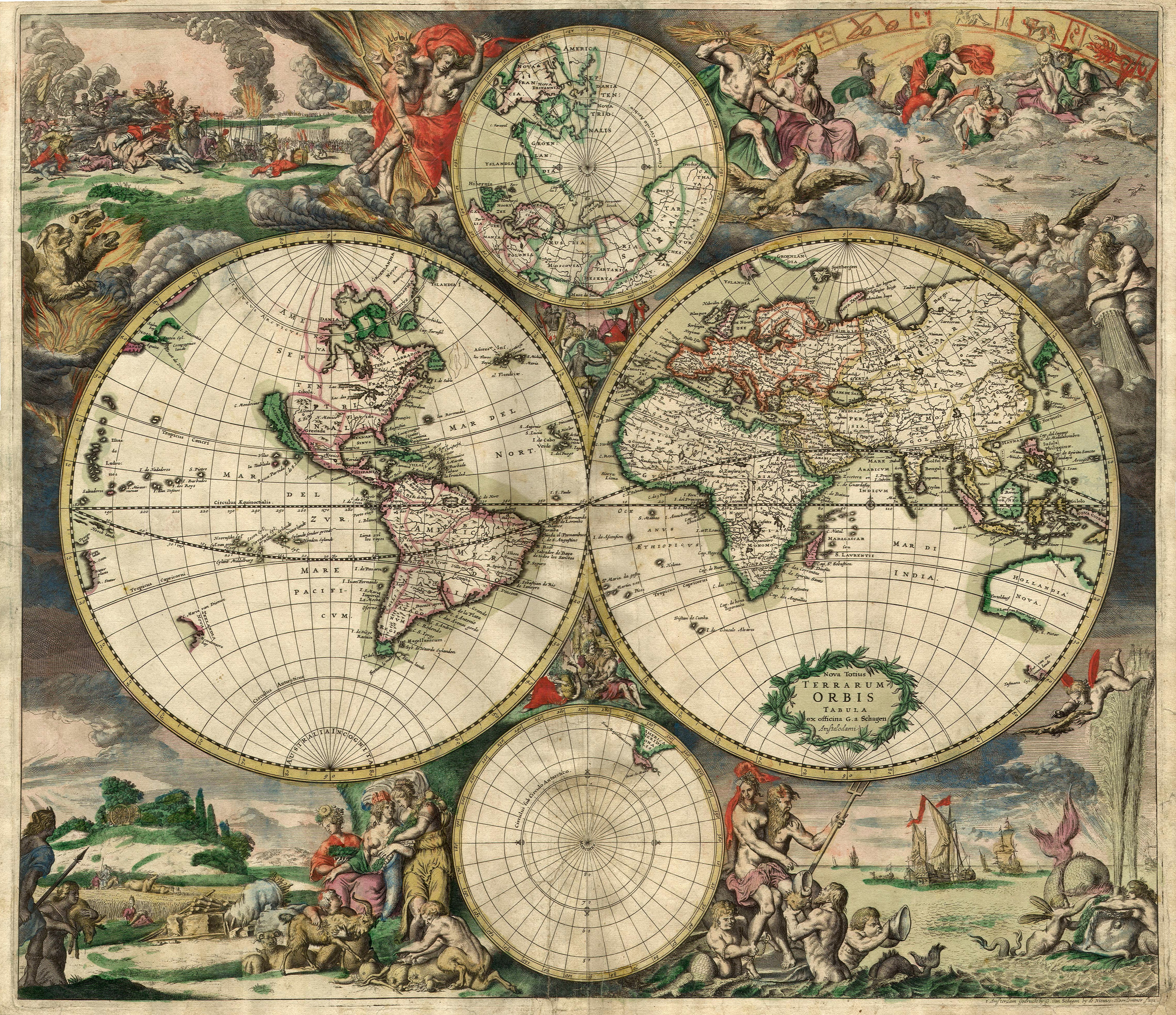
A 1689 map by Gerard van Schagen

In cartography, a map is a representation or abstraction of geographic reality. Maps are used for a wide range of purposes, including navigation, scientific research, governance, and warfare. A common use is route planning, which enables users to find their way to their destination. Specialized maps called charts are used for nautical navigation (nautical charts) and aviation (aeronautical charts). Scientists use maps to organize spatial data in fields such as geology, meteorology, seismology and demographics. Governments use maps for administrative functions such as census, electoral districts, property taxation, dispatching police, and coordinating disaster relief. Military and security organizations use maps for mission planning, surveillance, border management, logistics, and intelligence analysis.

One of the earliest preserved maps is from the Akkadian Empire (in modern Iraq) inscribed on a clay tablet and dated to 2300 BCE. By the 5th century BCE, Greeks were drawing maps of their known world, encompassing the Mediterranean Sea and most of Europe, North Africa, and the Middle East. Maps were important tools in the Age of Discovery, when mariners used them to explore new lands. Applications of cartography expanded in the late 17th century with the development of thematic maps, which portrayed specific kinds of data – such as rainfall or population density – rather than focusing on geographic features such as rivers, mountains, and cities. The rapid expansion of road networks and mass transit systems in the 20th century created a market for mass-produced maps aimed at the traveling public.

The development of computer cartography and geographic information systems in the mid-20th century enabled the storage of vast amounts of geographic data, which could be dynamically displayed and analyzed. Unlike paper maps, interactive maps let users zoom, pan, and choose which data to view. Geographic data used for mapmaking includes imagery, scanned paper maps, surveying measurements, geographic features, and terrain data.

Designing a map is a complex process involving the selection and arrangement of graphical elements to create a map that is informative, useful, and uncluttered. Because the amount of available geographic data often exceeds what can be effectively displayed, map designers must apply a generalization process to decide which elements to display and which to omit. The amount of detail is influenced by the map scale, expressed as a ratio between a distance on the map and the corresponding distance on the ground. The choice of a map projection is fundamental, as every projection introduces characteristic distortions. Geographic coordinates may be displayed as latitude and longitude, or in a Cartesian (XY grid) system. In addition to geographic data, maps may include supplemental elements such as legends (guides to the map's symbols), scale bars, north arrows, or inset maps.

== Definition and etymology ==
The word "map" first appeared in English around 1527 CE. It originates from the Late Latin word mappa ('napkin, cloth') arising from Classical Latin. Alternatively, it may stem from the French mappemonde or the Latin mappa mundi (both 'map of the world').

The meaning of "map" depends on the context. (Note: Cartographer John H. Andrews counted over 320 definitions of "map" in 1996.) In cartography, early definitions focused on representations of the Earth printed on paper, as in the 1938 definition by the cartographer Erwin Raisz (in the first major book on cartography in English) (Note: Raisz's definition is in his book General Cartography.): "a conventionalized picture of the Earth's pattern as seen from above, to which lettering is added for identification". The advent of computers and interplanetary exploration in the late 20th century led cartographers to adopt definitions that included media other than paper and depictions of things other than the Earth, as in the brief 1976 definition by the cartographer Arthur H. Robinson: "a graphic representation of the milieu". A 1987 definition by the cartographers John Brian Harley and David Woodward is "graphic representations that facilitate a spatial understanding of things, concepts, conditions, processes, or events in the human world". Later definitions widened to encompass maps as abstract models, such as the 1992 definition "a representation or abstraction of geographical reality: a tool for presenting geographical information in a way that is visual, digital or tactile". (Note: A 1989 definition is: "a holistic representation and intellectual abstraction of geographical reality, intended to be communicated for a purpose or purposes, transforming relevant geographical data into an end-product which is visual, digital or tactile".)

Outside cartography, "map" is used as an analogy or metaphor in a broad range of contexts. In the 19th century, the New English Dictionary (predecessor to the Oxford English Dictionary) included the definition "circumstantial account of a state of things". The Oxford English Dictionary, as of 2026, includes the primary definition (a representation of the Earth's surface) and also includes "a diagram or collection of data showing the spatial distribution of something or the relative positions of its components" and the figurative meaning "a conceptualization or mental representation of the structure, extent, or layout of an area of experience, field of study, or ideology". This article focuses on cartographic maps and does not cover metaphorical or figurative uses.

== Applications ==
Pilots use aeronautical charts, such as this one covering Puerto Rico, for navigation. (Note: Published by US Federal Aviation Administration. Data from 2026.)

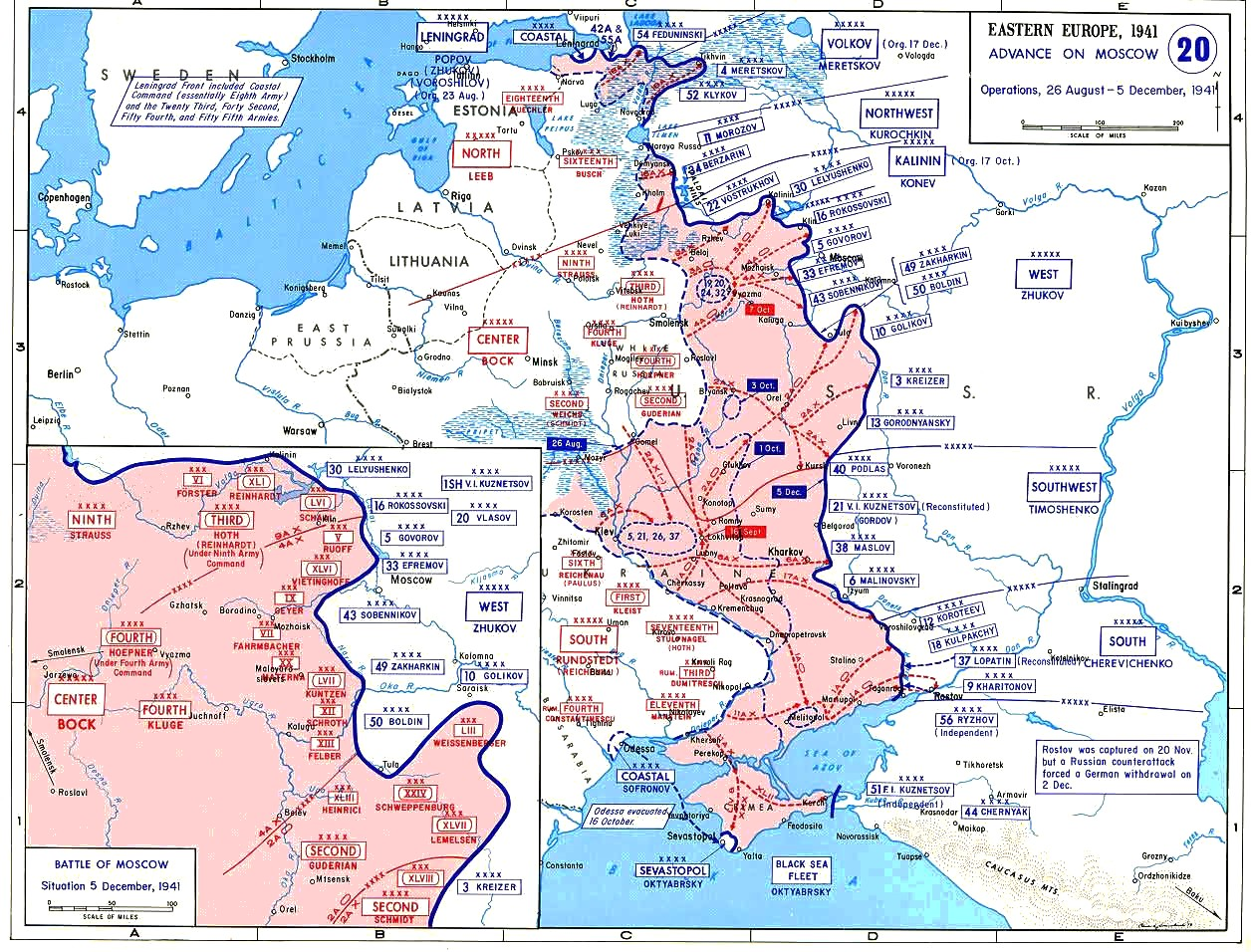
Maps are used to plan and monitor military campaigns and to document historical events. This map is of Operation Typhoon. (Note: Published by the History Department of the United States Military Academy.)

Maps support a wide variety of functions. Common applications of maps in everyday life include navigation and route planning: they are useful for finding nearby points of interest such as hospitals, gas stations, hotels, restaurants and parks. People planning vacations or outings often rely on maps to identify destinations, using road maps and tourist maps. Commercial and recreational traffic in the air and on the water uses maps (called "charts" in this context): air traffic relies on aeronautical charts, and water traffic uses nautical charts.

Military and security forces use maps for mission planning, surveillance, border management, and intelligence analysis. Politicians use maps to promote political agendas or propaganda, whether within a nation or in international disputes. In the commercial realm, maps are used for advertising and other persuasive purposes.

Government-related applications include census, elections, administration, and property taxation. Local or regional governments use maps for urban planning, such as designing roads, public transportation, housing developments, and green spaces. Public and private utilities use maps to maintain distribution systems for water, electricity, gas, telecommunications, and sewers. Emergency, fire, and police services use maps for evacuation planning, dispatching fire or police responders, and coordinating disaster relief. Cadastral maps are essential tools for managing real property boundaries, which are required for monitoring construction progress and creating zoning regulations. Governments also use maps to inform policy decisions about voting district boundaries, labor force analysis, utility service planning, social and educational services, poverty analysis, marketing analysis, flood risk, and agriculture.

Environmental protection and management utilize maps to monitor forests, wildlife habitats, climate change, floods, wildfires, and pollution. Foresters, ranchers, and farmers can use maps to manage land, resources, and forests.

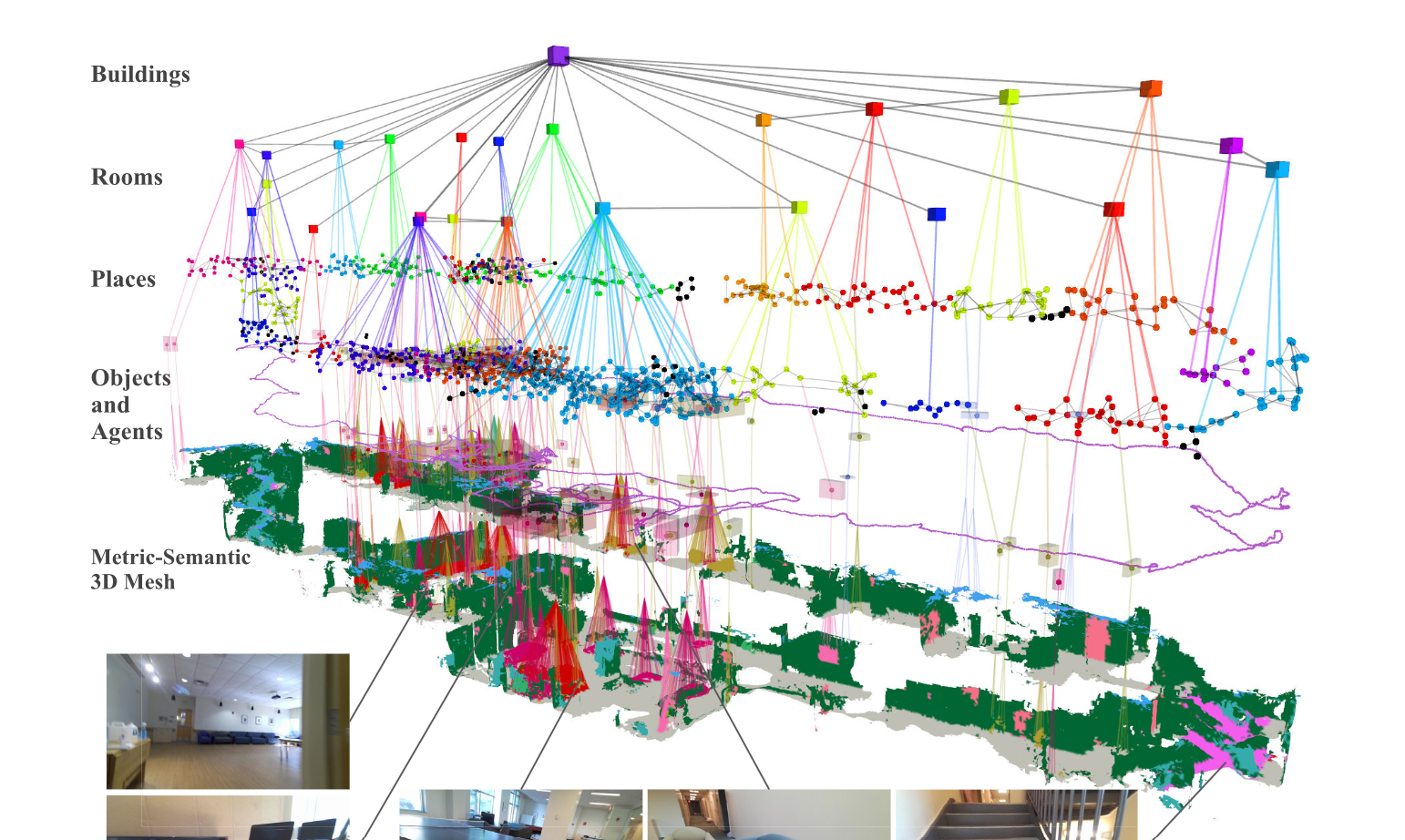
Robots can sense the environment (the "metric-schematic mesh", bottom) and convert the resulting data into a digital map (upper layers) for use in navigation. (Note: This image is from Fernando (2026), p. 67589.)

Scientists use maps to manage spatial data when studying subjects such as geology, weather, earthquakes, and population distribution. Maps help public health authorities track disease outbreaks, and scientists map genetic patterns in populations. Educators often use maps as tools when teaching geography, history, environmental science, and spatial thinking.

Journalists frequently use maps in their reporting to help audiences understand the geographic context of stories and events. Maps are sometimes considered things of beauty and displayed as artwork, used as home decorations, or incorporated into a larger work of art.

Digital maps support autonomous navigation and spatial awareness for unmanned aircraft, boats, cars, and robots. These devices can consult a digital map to determine their position (a process called "localization") and to determine a path to their goal. In some applications, unmanned vehicles dynamically create a digital map of their surroundings by exploring their environment; this process is called simultaneous localization and mapping (SLAM).

== History ==
=== Antiquity to 14th century ===
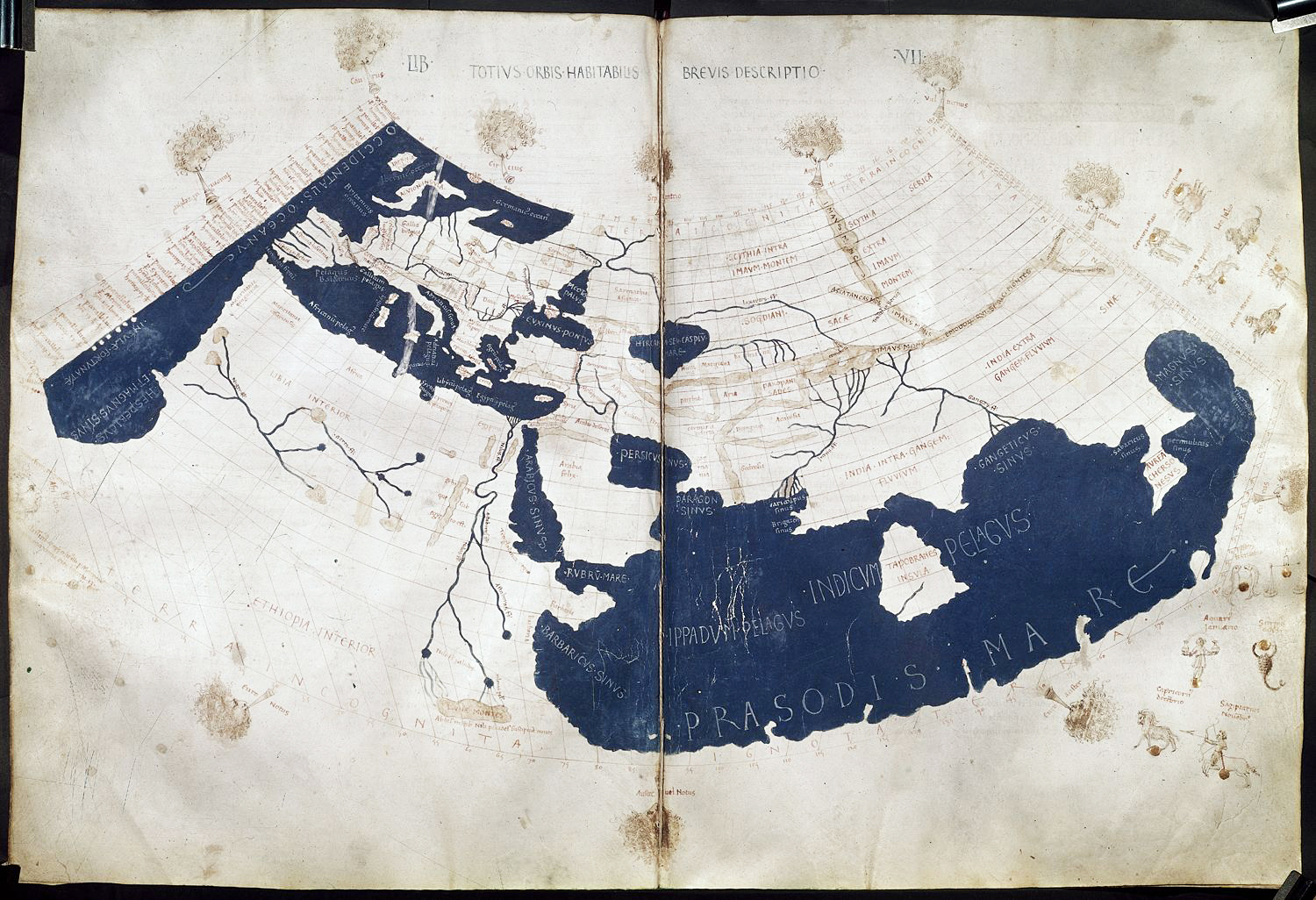
A world map based on Ptolemy's 2nd-century Geography (Note: According to the classicist Oswald A. W. Dilke, "The remarkable influence of Ptolemy on the development of European, Arabic, and ultimately world cartography can hardly be denied. Through both [his works] Mathematical Syntaxis ... and the Geography ... it can be said that Ptolemy tended to dominate both astronomy and geography – and hence their cartographic manifestations – for over fourteen centuries".)

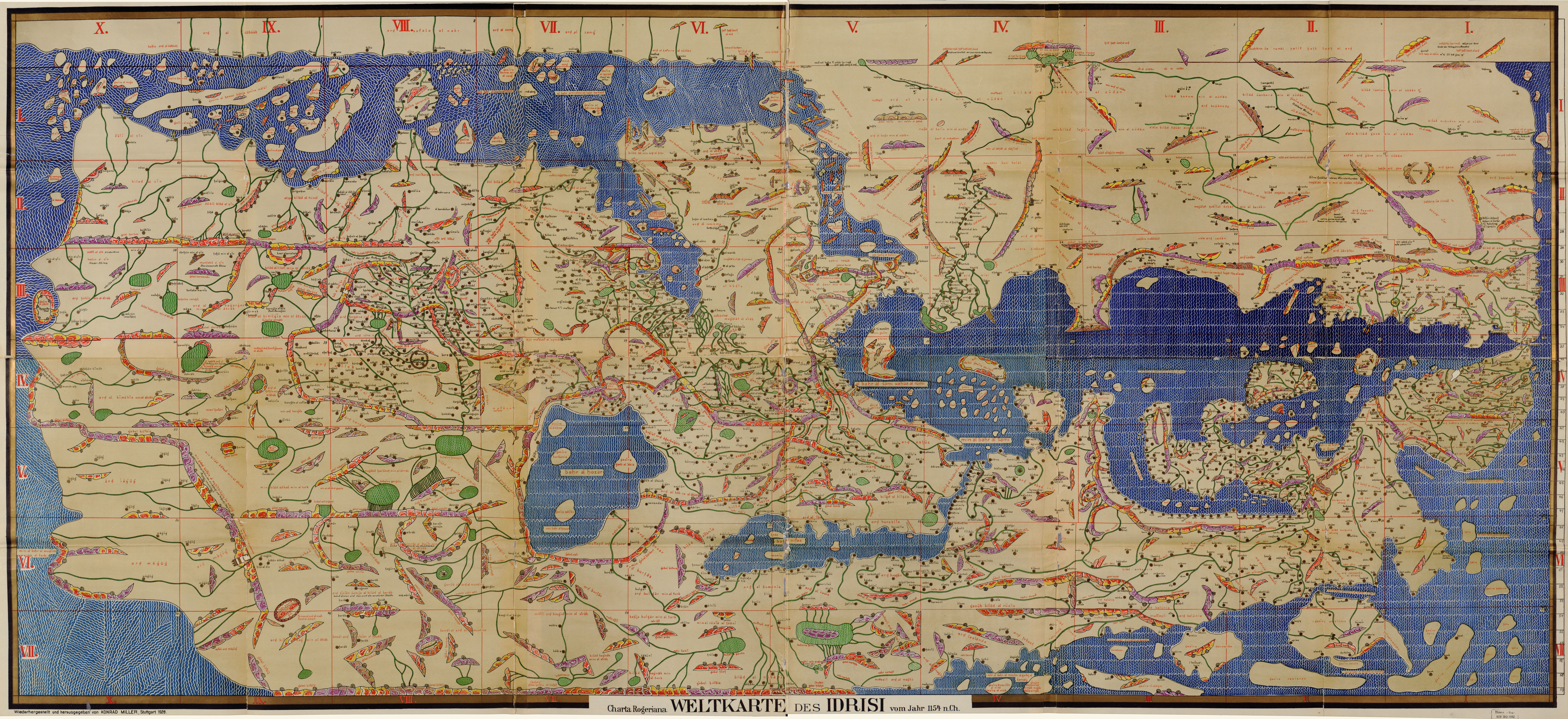
Tabula Rogeriana, an early world map, by Muhammad al-Idrisi, 1154 (north is down)

It is unknown when or where humans created the first maps. Their appearance in the records of numerous ancient cultures suggests that mapmaking originated in prehistory. One of the earliest preserved maps is inscribed on a clay tablet, dated to 2300 BCE, and found in Nuzi, within the Akkadian Empire (in modern Iraq). (Note: Maps are also found on Babylonian clay tablets ranging between 2000 and 600 BCE, including one that may be considered the first map of a culture's known world.) Egyptian maps on papyrus from 1300 BCE show the location of gold mines. A document from China dated 1020 BCE describes maps used for town planning. Early Chinese maps that are still preserved include one from the 4th century BCE engraved on a large bronze sheet, showing the location of five mausoleums, and a set of maps drawn on silk from the 2nd century BCE, which showed more sophistication than contemporary maps originating in Europe.

Around 490 BCE, Greek geographer Hecataeus created a map of his known world, encompassing the Mediterranean Sea and most of Europe, North Africa, and the Middle East. (Note: An earlier Greek cartographer was Anaximander (c. 610 – c. 546 BCE) who may have been the first to create a map of the world, and also created a globe.) One of the most influential early maps was a world map prepared around 150 CE by the Greco-Roman geographer and scientist Ptolemy. Maps created by the Romans – in contrast to the Greek emphasis on science – were used for political and administrative purposes: in 44 BCE Julius Caesar commissioned a map of the known world, which was prepared by Agrippa. The Romans also produced the Tabula Peutingeriana, which diagrammed most major roads of their empire. Like many modern transit maps, it is schematic in nature and is not drawn to scale. (Note: The exact date of the Tabula Peutingeriana is uncertain, but it may have been created around 350 CE.)

A notable set of maps from the Islamic world was the Nuzhat al-Mushtaq ('The Book of Pleasant Journeys into Faraway Lands') (Note: Full Arabic title is Nuzhat al-mushtāq fī ikhtirāq al-āfāq.) – an atlas created in 1154 by Muhammad al-Idrisi, an Arab geographer, at the request of Norman King Roger II. (Note: Muhammad al-Idrisi was from the Almoravid dynasty, located in modern Morocco. Harley & Woodward 1992, p. 156) Within medieval Europe, a large number of mappae mundi ('maps of the world') were created and – as Christianity dominated medieval European society – many incorporated religious themes. (Note: An aspect of the religious emphasis was that Jerusalem was placed at the center of many of these maps.) Scholars refer to some of the mappae mundi as T-O maps because they depicted the Earth as an "O" shape, containing three continents (Europe, Asia, and Africa) separated by waters in a "T" shape. (Note: Although the circular nature of T-O maps might suggest that the creators believed the Earth was flat, many medieval scholars – including a proponent of the T-O design Isidore of Seville – knew the Earth was round.)

=== 15th to 19th centuries ===
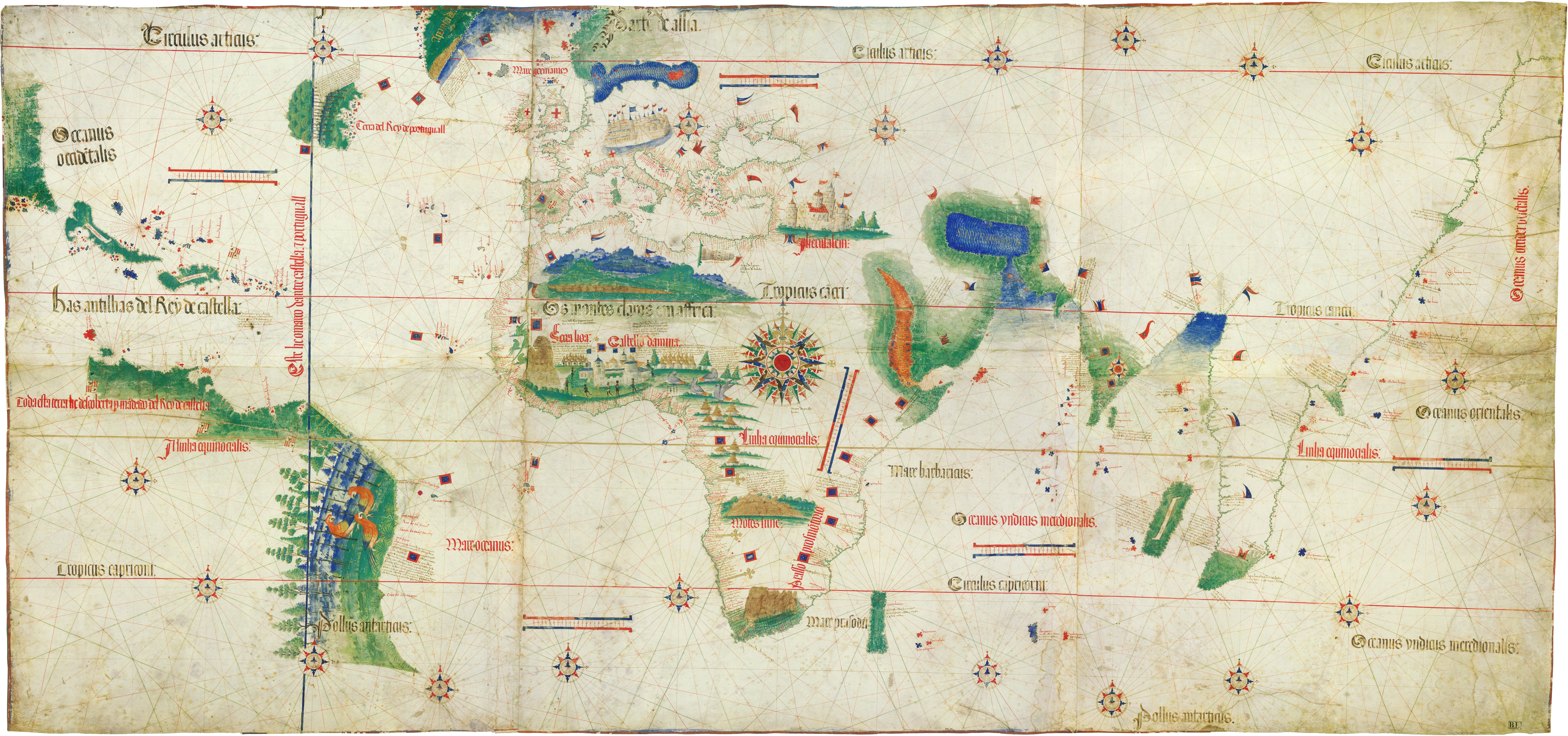
The Cantino planisphere, created about ten years after Columbus's first voyage, depicted parts of the Americas (far left).

Maps played a major role in the Age of Discovery. On his first voyage in 1492, Christopher Columbus carried a world map created by Paolo dal Pozzo Toscanelli. The map did not include the Americas and greatly underestimated the distance from Europe westward to Asia. That year, Martin Behaim created the Erdapfel (lit. 'Earth apple') – one of the earliest extant globes.

In the 16th century, map accuracy (Note: Accuracy and precision have distinct meanings in cartography: accuracy is an estimate of error between a location presented in the map and its true location. Precision is the granularity of location values in the map (disregarding the true value). For example, precision may be defined as the real-world distance represented by half a millimeter on a paper map, or half a pixel in raster imagery. A related term is "detectable size" which is the width of the smallest discernible object in the map, generally considered to be twice the precision. Tobler's Rule states that the detectable size (in meters) times 1000 is equal to the map scale.) improved with the development of triangulation (initially described by Gemma Frisius in 1533), which advanced surveying techniques by using devices such as plane tables and theodolites to precisely measure angles between lines of sight to landmarks. (Note: The English word "geometry" originated in the Greek word geōmetria ('measure the earth') from geō ('earth') + metron ('measure').) During this era, cartographers also advanced the study of map projections; notably Gerardus Mercator, who created the Mercator projection in 1569, which proved valuable to navigators because it allowed them to draw a straight line on the map pointing to their destination and reach it by following the indicated compass direction. When Europeans encountered indigenous peoples in Central and South America and in Oceania, they found maps already in use for navigation, administration, and commerce. (Note: The peoples of the Marshall Islands utilized Marshall Islands stick charts to navigate the ocean.)

The applications of cartography expanded in the late 17th century with the invention of thematic maps that focused on portraying a specific kind of data – such as rainfall or population density. (Note: Early thematic weather maps were created by Edmund Halley around 1686. Thematic maps may also portray some geographic features.) In the late 18th century, the accuracy of maps increased dramatically with the perfection of clocks that could keep accurate time for extended periods and withstand the violent motions of a ship and the temperature changes of different climates. These chronometers enabled longitude to be computed accurately at any point on Earth. For example, a voyager could sail to Easter Island and use a chronometer (in conjunction with other equipment, such as a sextant) to determine the precise latitude and longitude of the island. Cartographers could use such positions to prepare accurate maps.

Military applications led to innovations in cartography. In the late 18th century, Napoleon created a corps of geographic engineers to produce topographic maps for military use. The rise of nationalism in the 19th century was reinforced by maps, as noted by the French historian Christian Jacob, who wrote that maps focused on individual nations were "the visual glue of a sense of national identity".

=== 20th century to present ===
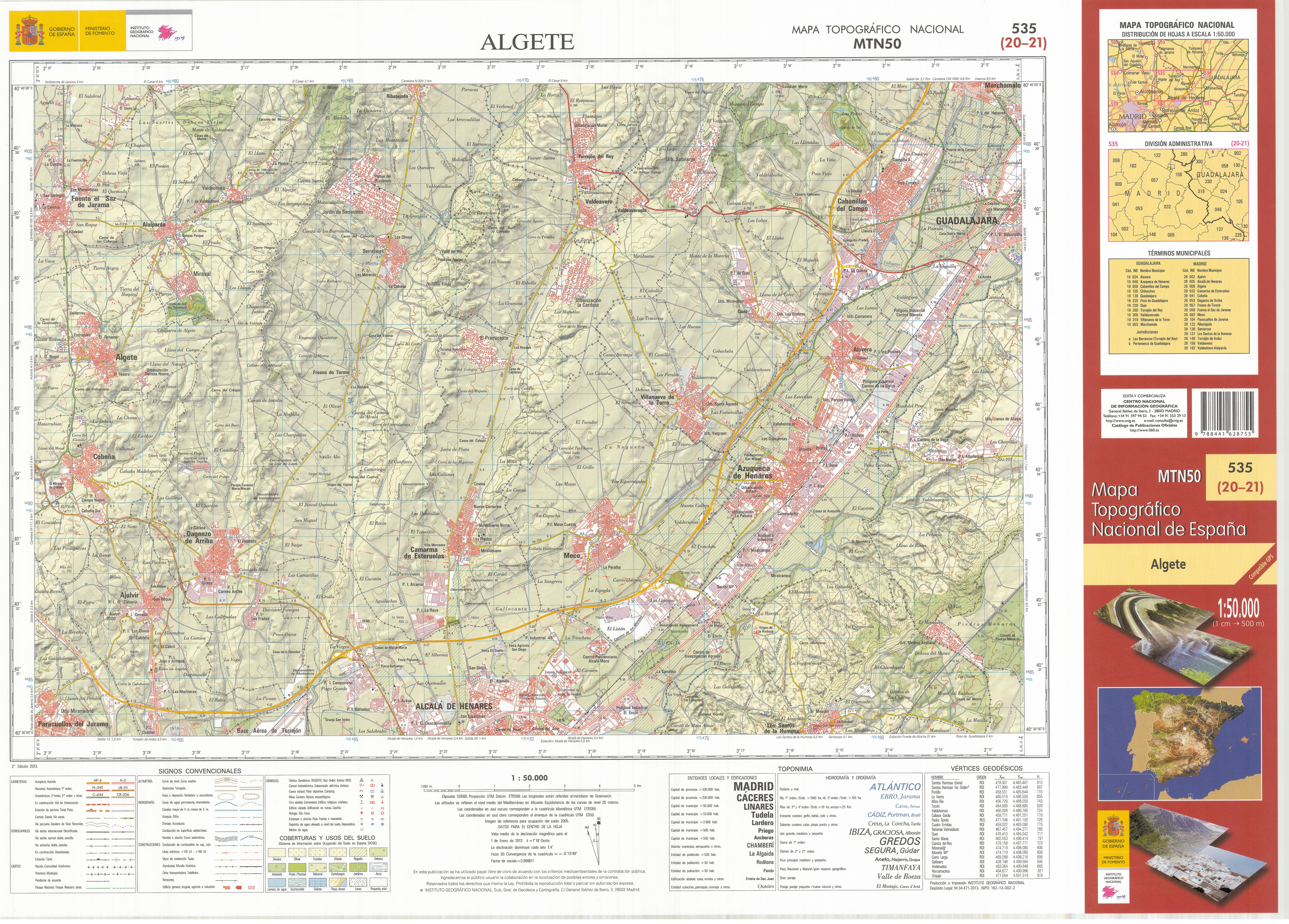
This 20th-century map produced by the government of Spain is a general reference map depicting terrain topography, buildings, transportation networks, and water features. (Note: Map data from 2013, published by National Geographic Institute (Spain).)

During World War I (WWI), cameras were mounted in airplanes that flew over battlefields and took photographs that were later analyzed for reconnaissance purposes. Some photos were used to update trench maps at scales up to 1:10,000. In the early 20th century, maps were widely used for propaganda by nations such as Soviet Russia and Nazi Germany to promote territorial claims and to exaggerate threats from perceived enemies. (Note: Using maps for propaganda purposes is sometimes described as "persuasive cartography" or "cartographic propaganda".)

The rapid expansion of road networks and mass transit systems in the 20th century created a market for mass-produced maps aimed at the traveling public. Road maps and transit maps became commonplace, including the 1933 London Underground map, which used an innovative schematic design that was more useful for passengers than a geographically accurate layout. After WWI, civilian cartographers used aerial photography in conjunction with the new science of photogrammetry to generate maps more rapidly than was possible with ground-based surveying. In the mid-20th century, the study of cartography shifted to a more rigorous and quantitative foundation, emphasizing the fundamentally mathematical nature of the discipline. (Note: Geographers William Bunge and William Warntz were leaders of the effort to promote the mathematical essence of geography and cartography.) Cartography was revolutionized in the latter half of the 20th century as computers and satellites enabled the new fields of computer cartography and remote sensing. Geographic information systems (GIS) allowed vast amounts of geographic data to be dynamically displayed on computer screens, so users could interactively zoom, pan, and choose which data to view. In the 21st century, maps are commonly displayed on mobile phones, provided by apps such as Google Maps and Apple Maps.

== Design ==
Map design is the process of selecting and arranging imagery and graphic symbols to effectively communicate geographic information. A cartographer must make many choices when designing a map, such as which data to include (or omit), coverage area, legend, orientation (which direction is north), scale, projection, coordinate system, map symbols, shapes, colors, labels, and typography. The choices depend on the purpose of the map and its intended audience.

=== Layout and hierarchy ===
An important aspect of map design is the layout, which involves arranging the geographic data and the auxiliary elements (such as the title, legend, map scale, and insets). Robinson defines layout as "the process of arriving at proper balance. In a well-balanced design, nothing is too light or too dark, too long or too short, or too small or too large, in the wrong place, or too close to the edge".

The cartographer Cynthia Brewer suggests that a map's design should visually distinguish key elements in a map from less important ones – a consideration called visual hierarchy. The elements with the highest priority in the visual hierarchy are the map title and features related to the map's primary purpose. Medium priority elements include the background geography. The lowest-priority elements are supplemental notes and information, often found in the margins. Visually, key elements should appear to be in the foreground, while less important ones are in the background – a figure-ground relationship.

The background graphics of a map are called the basemap, and its purpose is to provide context for higher priority elements. The basemap can include landforms, topography, transportation networks, or imagery.

=== Shape and neatline ===
Maps can be created in a variety of shapes. A common shape is rectangular, but some polar maps are circular. The edge of a map's geographic content is delimited by a neatline; the region outside the neatline is the margin. Some maps cover a quadrangle, which is a region of the Earth's surface bounded by two parallels (circles of constant latitude) and two meridians (lines of constant longitude). The neatline (extent) of a map may not use the same coordinate system as the map's data; for example, USGS topographic maps use a latitude/longitude quadrangle for the extent, but Universal Transverse Mercator (UTM) for the map's projection and geographic coordinates. In some maps, the neatline may not be a perfect rectangle or may not have 90-degree corners.

Maps with non-rectangular extent

An equidistant projection centered on Khartoum

A land hemisphere map with extensions

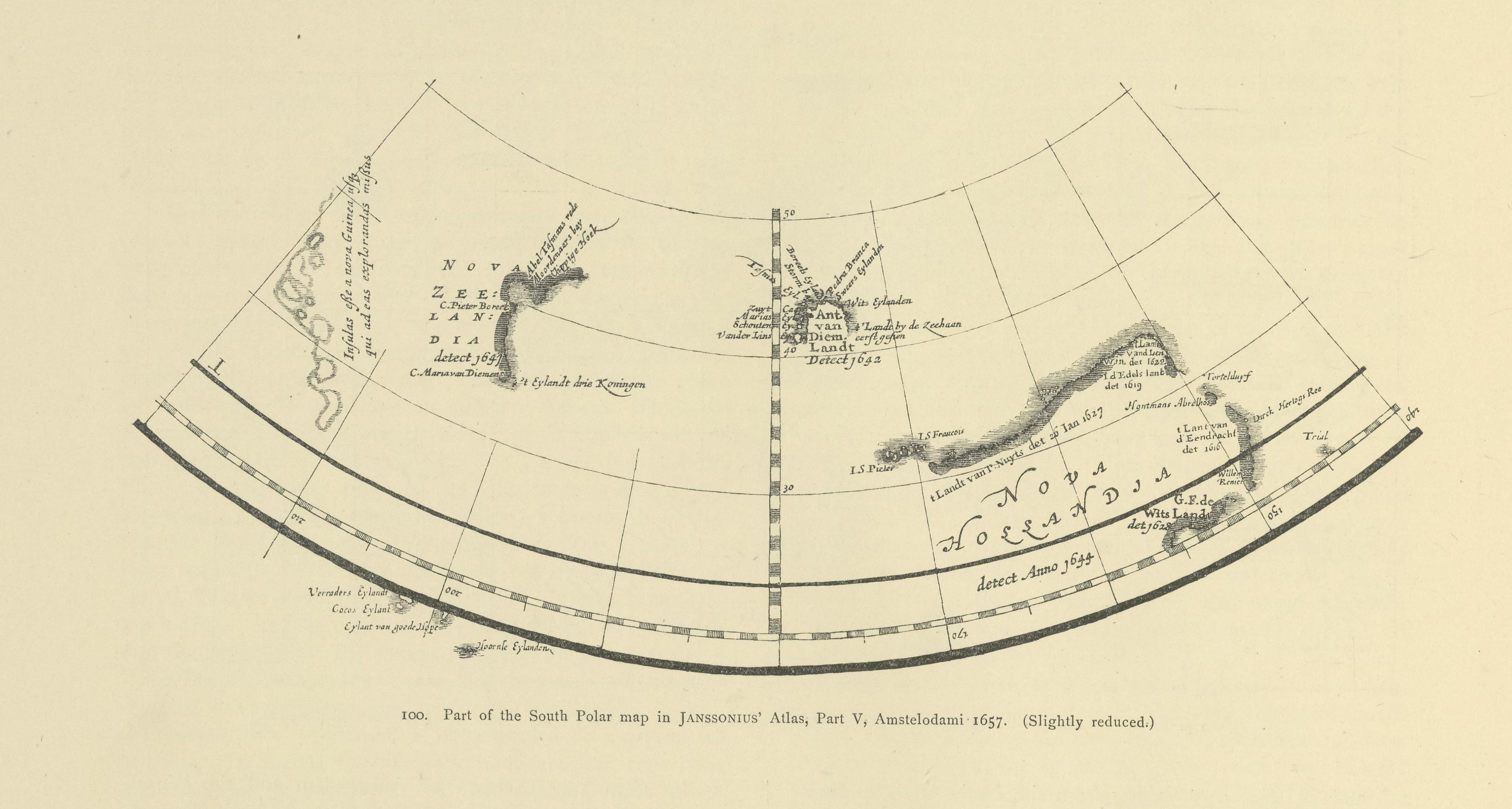
A 1657 south-up map of the South Atlantic

=== Scale ===
Map scales

This large-scale map has higher resolution and covers a smaller region. This is a scan of a paper map printed with a scale of 1:24,000. (Note: This map is a 1973 revision of a 1956 map published by USGS.)

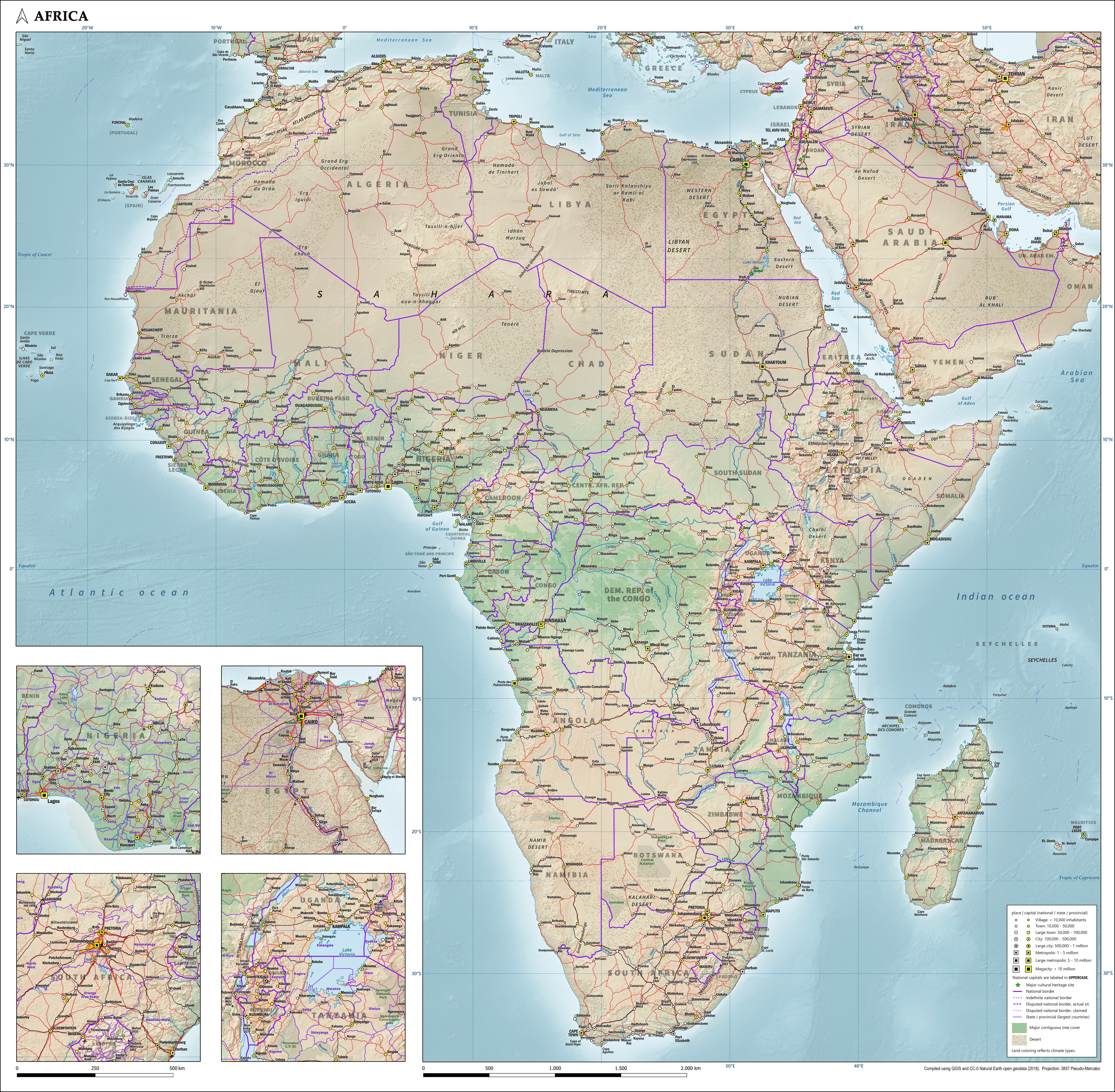
This small-scale map has lower resolution and covers a larger region. The scale of this digital map varies within the map, but is roughly 1:4,000,000. (Note: The scale of this map varies throughout the map. In the north-south direction, the map is approximately 4,000 pixels and 8,000 km, which is a resolution of 2 km per pixel, which corresponds to a map scale of roughly 1:4,000,000, although it depends on how the map is rendered and other factors. All values are approximate.)

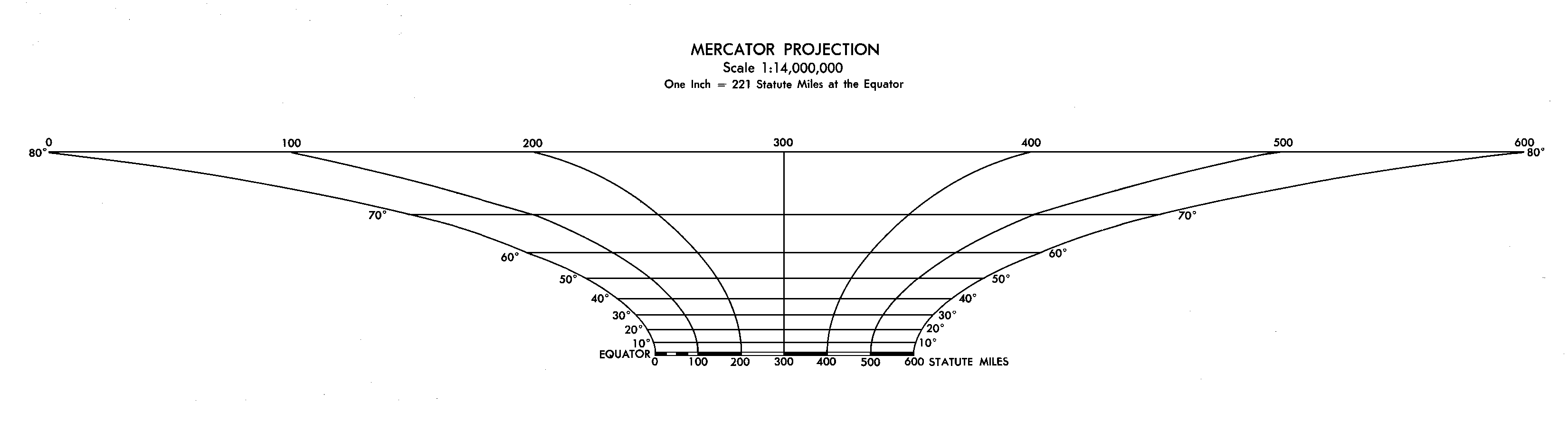
On some small-scale maps, the scale varies substantially with latitude. A graphic showing multiple scales, such as the one shown here, can be useful for such maps. (Note: This diagram was published by the Defense Mapping Agency.)

The scale of a map is a numerical value that indicates how measurements on the map relate to the reality they depict. Map scales are typically stated as a ratio, such as 1:12,000, which means that every centimeter (cm) on the map represents 12,000 cm (or 120 m) on the ground. Scales can be useful in many contexts. For example, a navigator can measure the distance between two points on a map, and divide by the scale to obtain an approximate value of the distance between the two points in the world. (Note: Map scales generally indicate the ratio of distances between objects, not the ratio of areas of objects. Some maps define an "area scale" value to relate map areas to real-world areas.)

Maps can be classified as "small scale" (lower resolution, covering large areas) or "large scale" (higher resolution, covering small areas). There is no official dividing line between large and small scales, although 1:500,000 or 1:1,000,000 are sometimes used as partitions. In some contexts, a third term – "medium scale" – may be used for maps with scales ranging from about 1:250,000 to 1:1,000,000.

Because map projections introduce distortion when the Earth's curved surface is represented on a flat map, the scale of a map always varies across the map. For large-scale maps that cover a small region, these variations are generally small, and the scale can often be treated as constant across the map. For small-scale maps that cover large areas like continents or the whole Earth, the variations in scale can be large, and the scale should be treated as merely a nominal value.

The notion of scale is closely related to the concept of resolution, which is the granularity or precision with which locations are measured. Some cartographers define the resolution of a paper map as the distance represented by half a millimeter on the map. For example, a 1:10,000 scale map has a resolution of 5 m; and a 1:1,000,000 scale map has a resolution of 500 m.

Map scales were originally used in the context of paper maps, where the ratio of map to reality has an unambiguous definition. However, scales can also be applied to digital map databases. Since a database does not have a definitive paper representation, the scale is instead based on the resolution of the database's feature coordinate values. For example, a database that contains features stored with a 5 m resolution could be considered to have a scale of 1:10,000. The same process is used to define the scale of a raster image of the Earth: for example, an image with each pixel representing 2 km would correspond to a map scale of 1:4,000,000.

=== Generalization ===
Examples of the generalization process

Generalization is the process of reducing or adjusting the information shown on a map so that it more effectively serves its intended purpose. The nature of this process depends on the type of map, its scale, and its audience. Procedures performed during generalization include selection, simplification, exaggeration, aggregation, smoothing, elimination, and symbolization. (Note: Generalization processes named by various cartographic authorities (order not significant): Robinson 1995 – Selection, classification, simplification, exaggeration, and induction.; Field 2018 – Selection, amalgamation, exaggeration, displacement, refinement, simplification, aggregation, typification, smoothing, enhancing, collapsing, and merging.; Monmonier 2018 – Simplification, smoothing, aggregation, amalgamation, collapsing, merging, refinement, exaggeration, and displacement.; Slocum 2009 – Simplification, smoothing, aggregation, amalgamation, collapse, merging, refinement, exaggeration, enhancement, displacement.)

The process of generalization is functionally the same for both manually designed maps and interactive digital maps. However, generalization of interactive maps is partially automated by software applications. (Note: Some interactive maps enable the user to select or filter the data that is visualized, which is a form of generalization.) The first step in generalization is typically selection, which is simply choosing which types of features to include in the map. Depending on the purpose of the map, the mapmaker may omit, for example, roads, buildings, bodies of water, or towns with a population under 100,000.

Simplification is the process of simplifying a particular feature (such as a river, grove of trees, group of buildings, etc.) by eliminating detail. For example, a grove of eight distinct trees may be replaced by one tree; or a fence defined by twenty straight segments may be reduced to five segments. (Note: An algorithm that performs simplification on a line is the Ramer–Douglas–Peucker algorithm.) The degree of simplification depends on how many features should appear on the final map and how densely they should be placed. (Note: A rule of thumb for simplification is: $$nc= {ns * \sqrt{sc/ss} }$$ where nc is the number of items on the produced map; ns is the number of items in the source data (covering the same region; the source can be a map or database); sc is the map scale of the produced map; and ss is the scale of the source data.)

The process of exaggeration involves enlarging some aspect of an object to better convey the object's real-world essence. Aggregation is grouping several distinct objects into one. Examples include grouping multiple point objects into one; multiple point objects into an areal object; or multiple areal objects into one. Smoothing a line or perimeter involves replacing the line with a smoother version that captures the essence of the line while eliminating jagged, fine-scale features. (Note: Elimination is a process similar to smoothing: elimination simplifies a line or perimeter by deleting some vertices from the line.) Symbolization is the process of choosing a graphical depiction to represent each real-world object. Selecting the graphical attributes of the depictions – including shape, color, size, and pattern – is an important part of the symbolization process. (Note: In cartography, "symbolization" – which is a process used to create every type of graphical marking on a map – should not be confused with "symbols", which are graphical icons, pictograms, or shapes that are designed to present qualitative and quantitative data in a compact manner.)

=== Symbolization ===
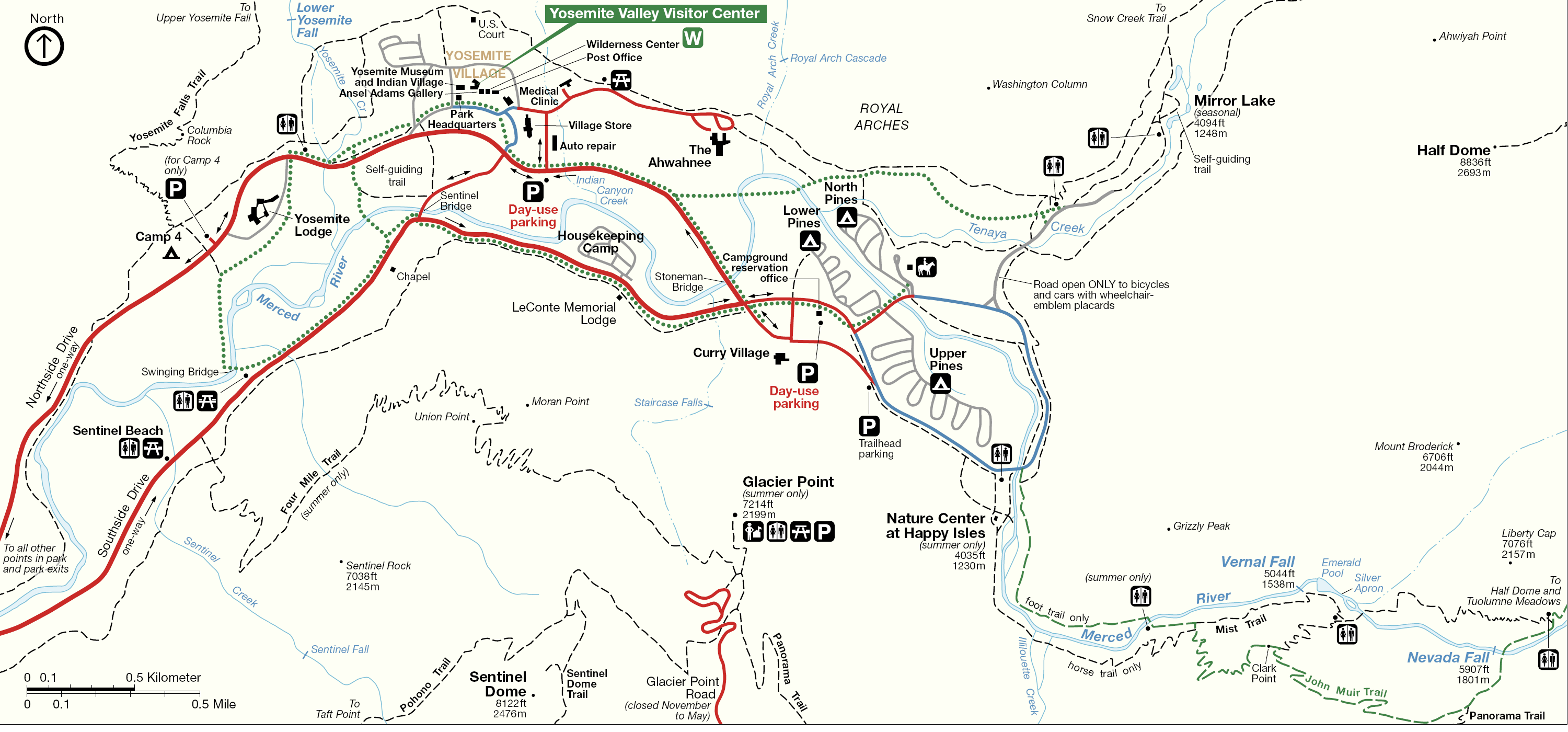
Symbolization is the process of selecting colors, shapes, symbols, and icons for a map. This park map uses solid lines for roads, dashed or dotted lines for trails. Red roads are open to the public, blue are not. Small icons designate parking lots and campgrounds. (Note: This is a detail from a larger map published by the US National Park Service.)

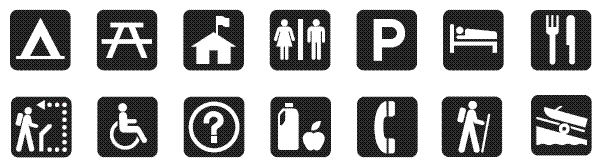
Symbols used in some maps of parks. (Note: These icons were published by US National Park Service.)

Symbolization is the process of selecting graphical markings to represent real-world geographic features or data. The markings can include a wide variety of shapes, dots, icons, graphics, and other visual indicators. Symbolization may indicate magnitude or kind by varying attributes of the graphics, such as color, shape, size, and pattern. The meaning of the graphics is often explained in a map legend (guide to the map's symbols) on the map, or in a separately published document.

Symbolization is particularly important in thematic maps, which typically depict the kind or magnitude of a specific datum across a map. Symbolization techniques suitable for thematic maps include proportional symbols, lines of constant value (for isopleth maps), dots (for dot distribution maps), and colored areas (for choropleth maps and dasymetric maps). Example maps illustrating these techniques appear in the thematic maps section below.

The process of symbolization should be distinguished from map symbols, which are graphical icons, pictograms, or shapes that are designed to present features or data in a compact manner. Symbols are just one category of graphical elements that symbolization utilizes. Examples of symbols used in maps include tents (representing campgrounds), airplanes (airports), and the letter "P" (parking).

=== Projection ===
The distortion of a projection can be visualized with Tissot's indicatrix.

A projection is an algorithm that transforms all or part of the Earth's surface (Note: Or the surface of any object being mapped, such as the Moon.) into a two-dimensional representation. There are dozens of projections that mapmakers can choose from when creating a map. All projections introduce some distortion because it is impossible to represent a spheroidal surface on a flat surface without tearing or stretching it.

Some projections preserve important characteristics of the spheroidal surface. Equal-area projections preserve the relative sizes of regions. Conformal projections preserve the angles between intersecting lines, and give the impression that shapes are approximately preserved. Equidistant projections preserve distances between one or two specific points to all other points. Some projections – called compromise projections – try to balance multiple goals, without perfectly achieving any one of them; a notable example is the Robinson projection. Projections commonly used for maps of the whole Earth include Goode homolosine projection, Mercator, and Robinson. For maps that cover large parts of the world (but not the full globe), common projections include Lambert azimuthal and Miller cylindrical.

Some projections of the Earth

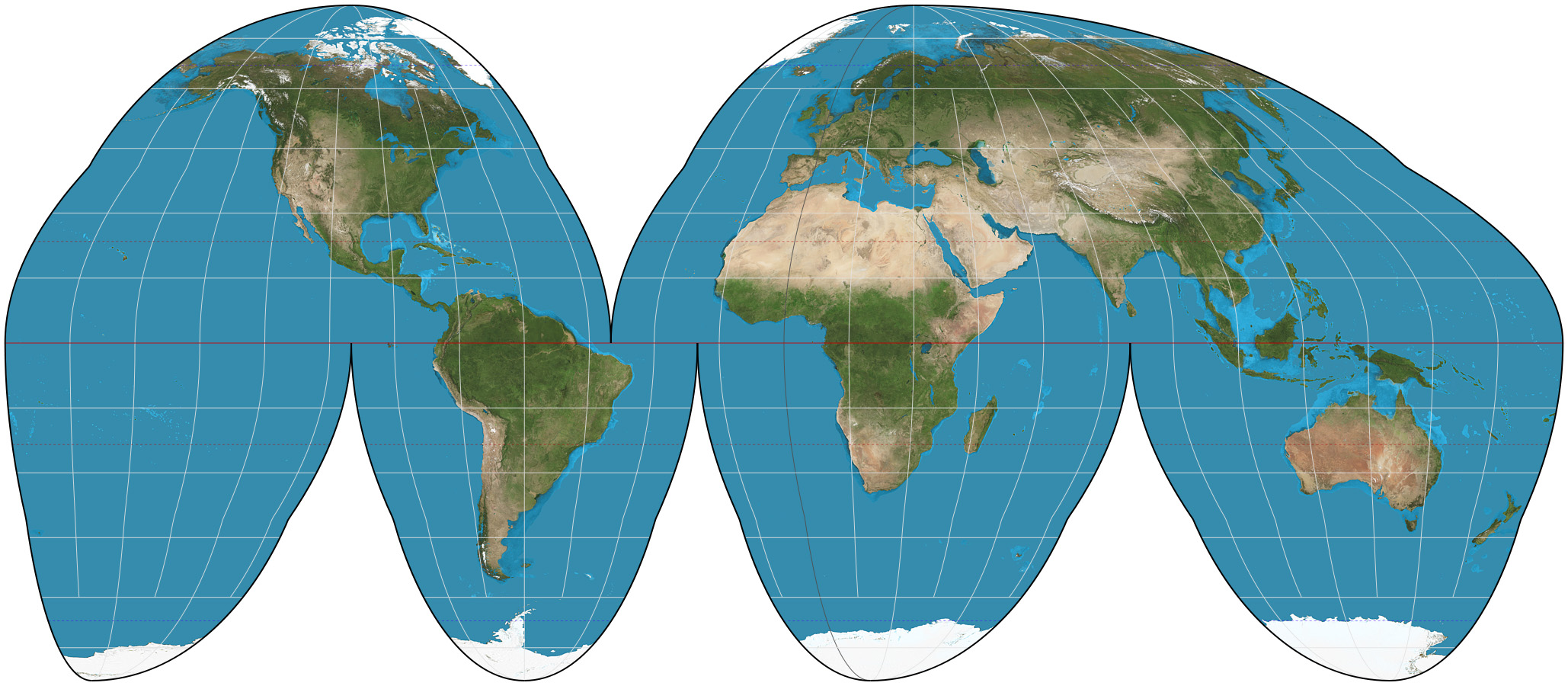
Interrupted Goode homolosine

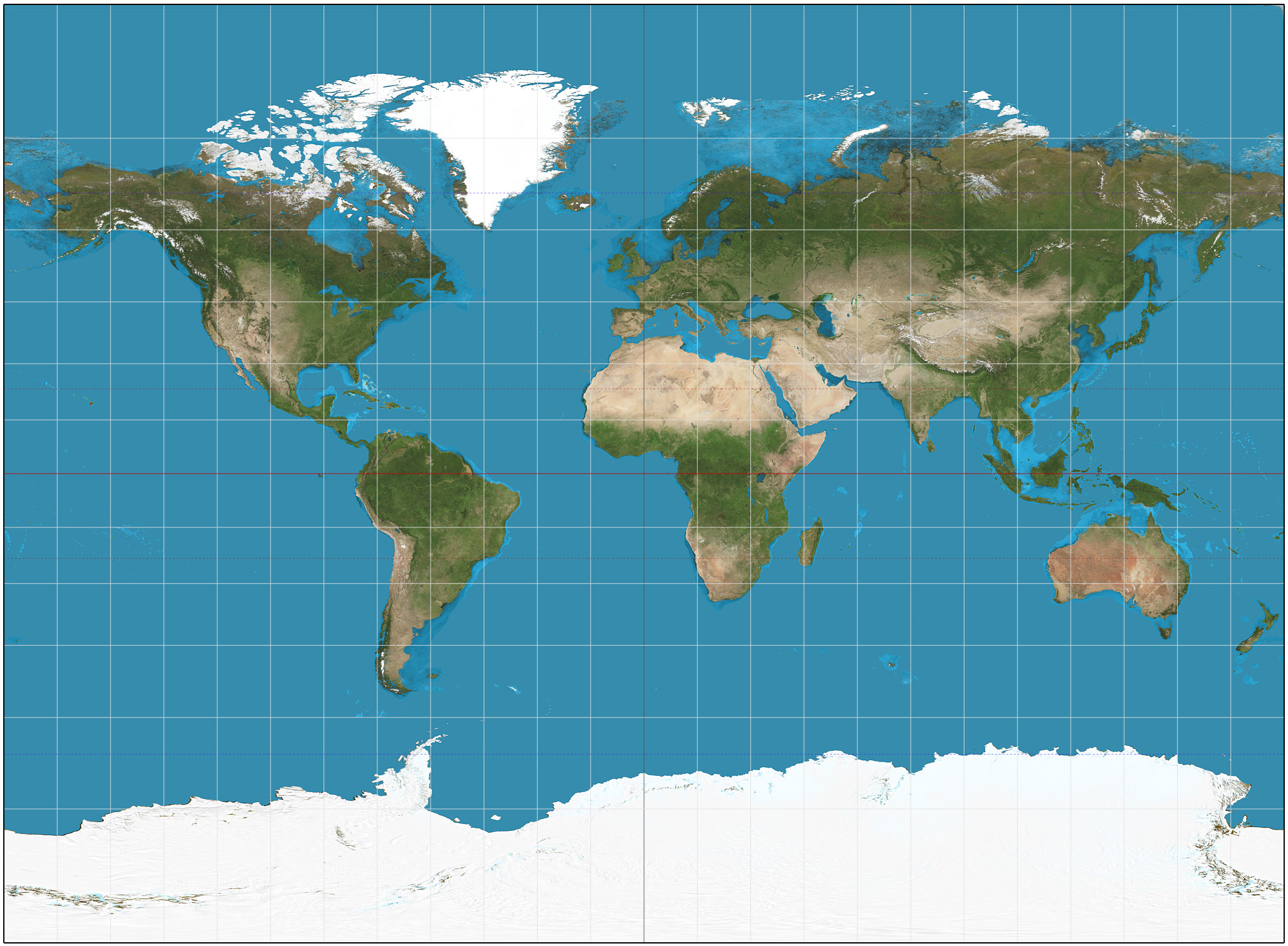
Miller cylindrical

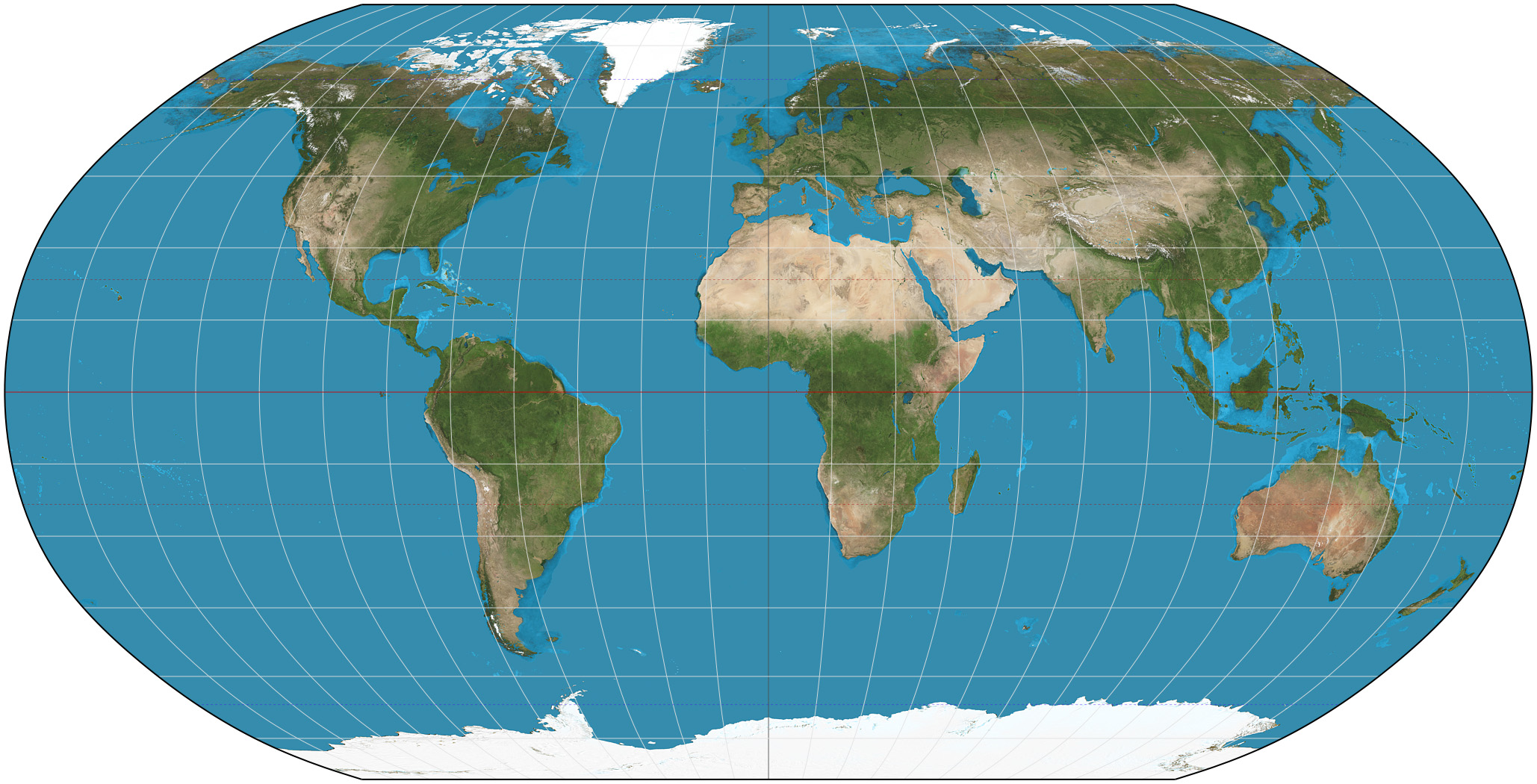
Robinson

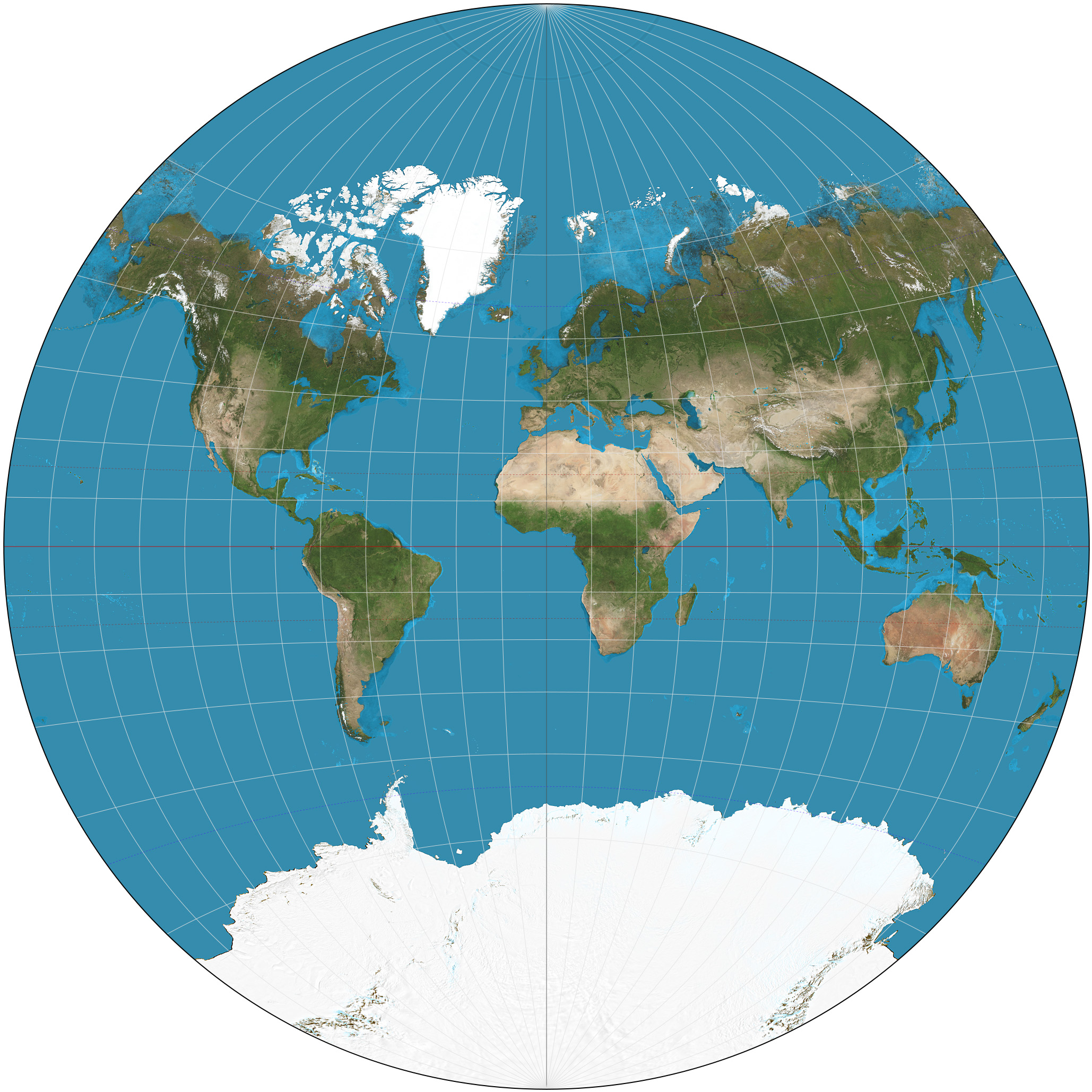
Van der Grinten

A controversial projection is Web Mercator – a variant of the standard Mercator projection – which was adopted by Google around 2005 for use in its online zoomable global map. The projection has been criticized by the European Petroleum Survey Group and National Geospatial-Intelligence Agency for its large distortions in the higher latitudes, as well as for inaccuracies in coordinates when zoomed in. (Note: The NGA US government mapping agency disapproves of the Web Mercator projection, writing: "NGA does not endorse nor does NGA support the spherical based Web Mercator map projection (and variant namings such as WGS 84 Web Mercator) for the acquisition, visualization, exploitation, and exchange of any GEOINT data for the NSG".)

=== Coordinate system ===
Maps of the full Earth often use ellipsoidal coordinate systems which specify locations as degrees of latitude and longitude.

Projected coordinate systems are often used for maps of provinces or small countries.

UTM is a projected coordinate system that covers the entire Earth and measures XY positions in meters, rather than degrees. (Note: A variant of UTM used by NATO is the Military Grid Reference System (MGRS), which extends UTM to include the polar regions.)

When a map displays coordinates of places and objects, the mapmaker must select a coordinate system, which is based on a specific geodetic datum. A geodetic datum consists of two independent parts: a vertical datum for elevation (height) coordinates, and a horizontal datum for horizontal position (e.g., distance north and distance east).

Vertical datums are imaginary surfaces used as a baseline to measure an object's elevation. Vertical datums are categorized as ellipsoids or geoids. An ellipsoid, such as WGS84, is an imaginary, smooth spheroid that roughly approximates mean sea level. Geoids approximate sea level more precisely: they are the shape the surface of the world's oceans would take under the influence of Earth's gravity and rotation alone, without winds or tides. Geoids are not a smooth spheroid: they have undulations due to the variability of the Earth's gravitational field.

Horizontal datums define a coordinate system for horizontal locations and ignore elevation (height). A horizontal datum is an ellipsoid that covers the entire Earth and measures locations, in degrees, as latitude and longitude. There are several ellipsoidal horizontal datums available, including World Geodetic System 84, European Datum 1950, and North American Datum 83.

A coordinate system is either a horizontal datum (an ellipsoid) or a projected coordinate system. Projected coordinate systems specify horizontal locations as XY Cartesian values in units of meters or feet (rather than degrees), and are thus sometimes more convenient to use than ellipsoidal systems. A notable projected coordinate system is UTM which is commonly used for military applications because it is a global system in which angles are accurately represented and XY locations are measured in meters, which may be more convenient than degrees.

For example, the location of the Augusta Raurica archaeological site in Switzerland can be represented in two coordinate systems as:

Coordinates of the Augusta Raurica archaeological site
Coordinate system	X or Longitude	Y or Latitude	Datum Type	Coord. type	Units	Map projection
WGS84	7.721402°	47.533860°	Ellipsoid	Spherical	degrees	None
UTM zone 32 North	403,767 m	5,265,285 m	Projected	Cartesian	meters	Transverse; Mercator

Many nations define coordinate systems tailored to the country or its provinces. (Note: Local datums are usually established by national mapping agencies.) These local coordinate systems are typically projected coordinate systems. For example, Britain uses a transverse Mercator projection for its Ordnance Survey National Grid. A nation may have many such coordinate systems, each tailored for a specific province, state, or region. For example, the US uses 125 coordinate systems that cover the country.

=== Colors and patterns ===
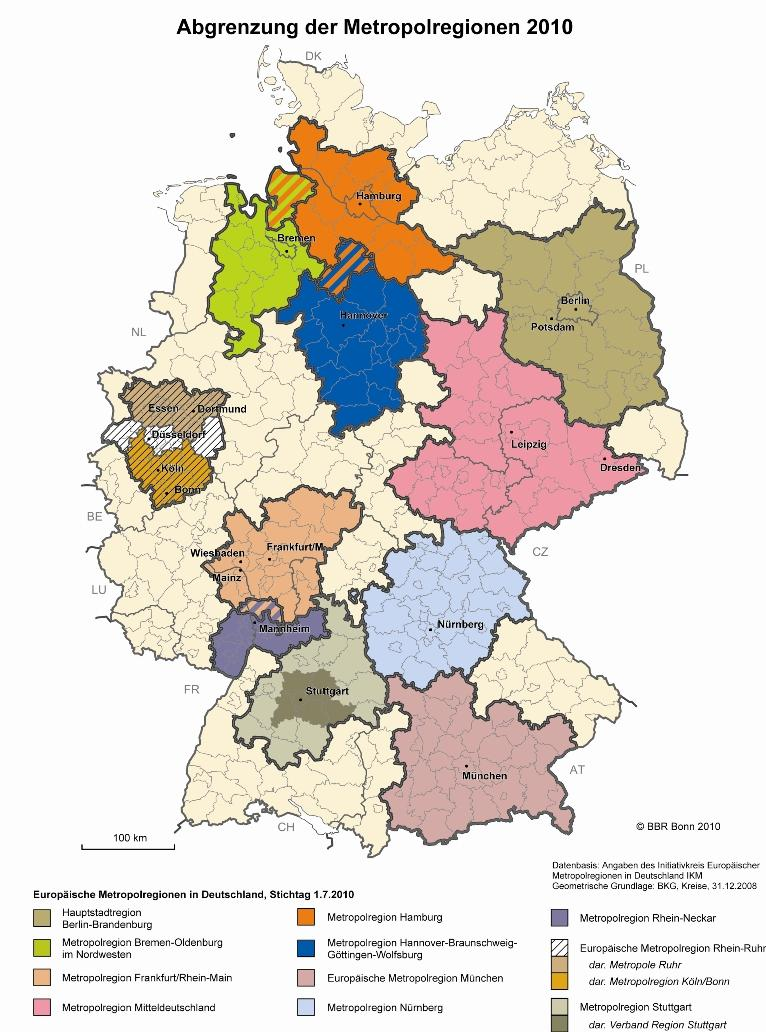
This map uses both color (hue) and pattern (hatching) to distinguish regions.

This thematic map uses a single hue and varies the lightness to distinguish data values.

Colors play an important role in map design: many users prefer colorful maps, and the appropriate use of color can make a map more informative. Any color may be characterized by a particular combination of three independent attributes: hue, lightness, and saturation. Of those attributes, hue is generally used to indicate important distinctions within a map. Lightness can also be used to distinguish features in a map, particularly for progressively coloring regions in a quantitative map.

Cartographers have not established an international standard for color conventions. Examples of color conventions used in some government-produced maps in the US are: (Note: These example color conventions are applicable to general reference maps that focus on roads, rivers, towns, and other basic geographic features. These color conventions are not applicable to thematic maps that use color-coding to indicate numerical data values.)

Blue: water and rivers
Green: vegetation or forested areas
Brown: elevation contour lines
Tan or yellow: desert or arid regions
Red: urban areas; major roads
Black: lettering, buildings, railways, boundaries, gridlines, small or medium roads
Purple: aviation-related graphics (on aeronautical charts)

In maps, patterns are repeating design motifs that fill areas and convey information to the user. The patterns may consist of lines, dots, pictographs, or hatching. For example, patterns may be used to distinguish biomes such as swamp, desert, or forest. The International Geographical Union published a set of patterns to be utilized to designate soil types, including patterns for mud, clay, sandstone, and gravel. Colors and patterns may be used in combination within a single area.

=== Typography and labels ===
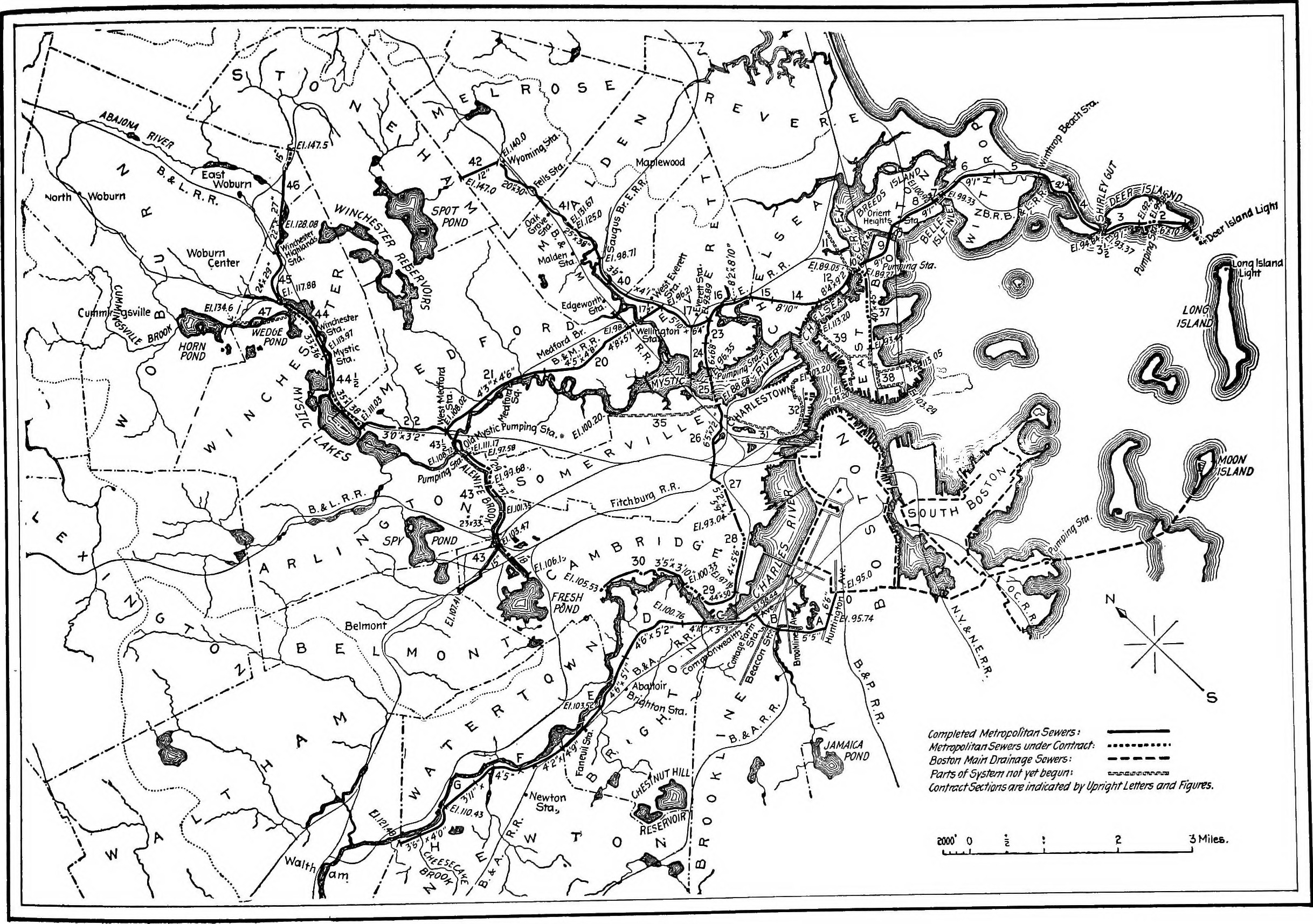
This map from a 1919 book on lettering provides guidance on placing hand-written text on a map.

Many maps include textual labels that identify features. The design and layout of the text are major factors in the overall graphical quality of the map. Maps often use multiple fonts and typefaces on a map to convey information to the user. For example, a map may use italic, boldface, or various sizes of lettering to indicate water features vs land features, or to designate the size of a city or town. Positioning textual labels in a manner that is helpful and attractive is an important part of the design process. Positioning can be performed manually by a cartographer, or automatically by software algorithms. Positioning guidelines that are sometimes used include: (Note: There are no official, standardized label-positioning guidelines. The guidelines listed here are examples used by various cartographers.)

- Text should be aligned horizontally, although in large maps covering the whole Earth or large regions (small scale maps) the text may instead be aligned along lines of latitude.
- Text should generally be in a straight line, not curved. Exception: when aligning text along lines of latitude on a small-scale map.
- Spacing between letters should generally be tight.
- When text and graphical objects (such as lines) interfere, the text has priority and the graphic should be interrupted.
- A name should be entirely on land or on water, but not straddle both.
- Labels of point features should be offset in a consistent manner, for example, above and slightly to the side of the feature.

=== Orientation ===
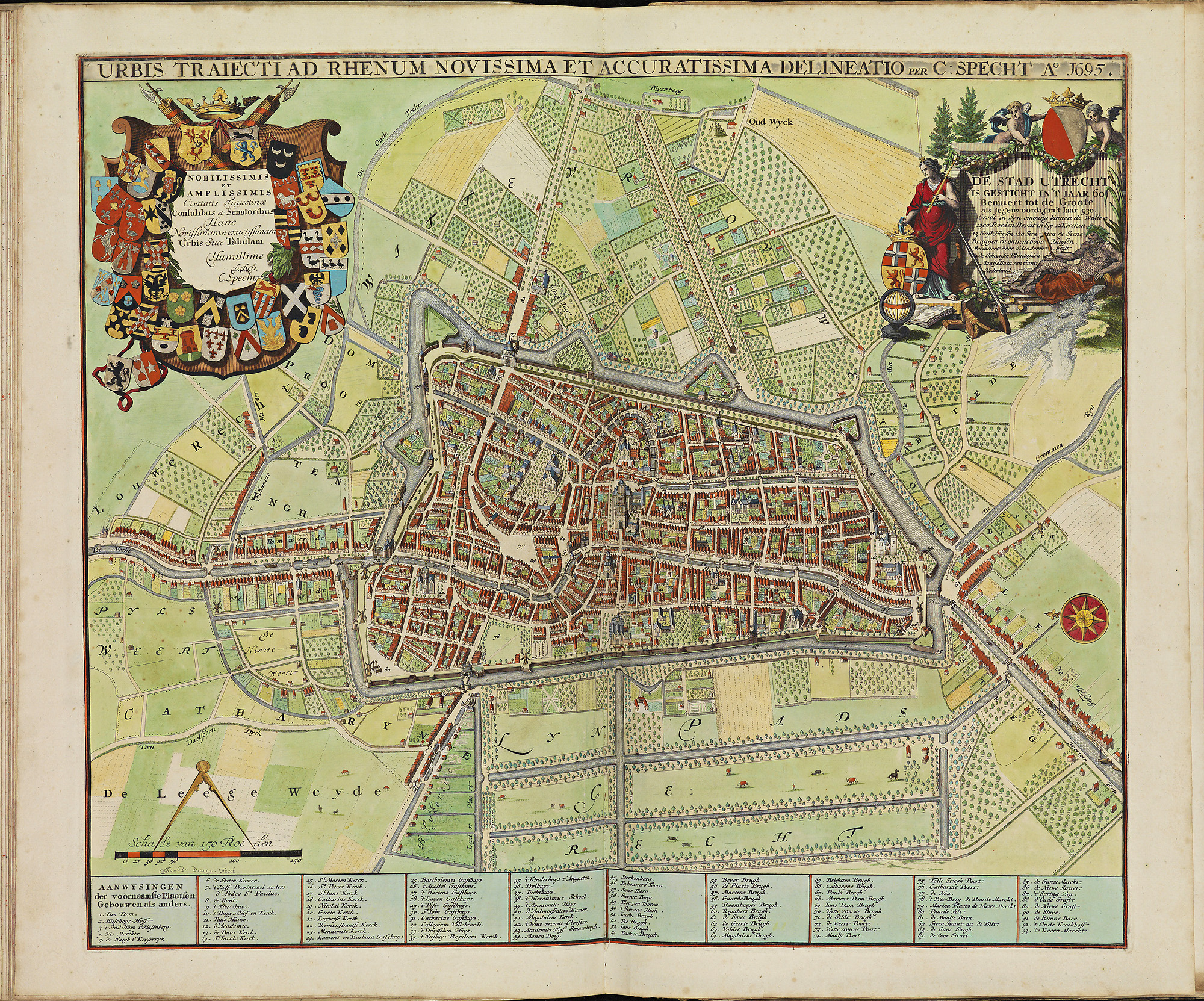
The top of this 1695 map of Utrecht, the Netherlands, is slightly north of east.

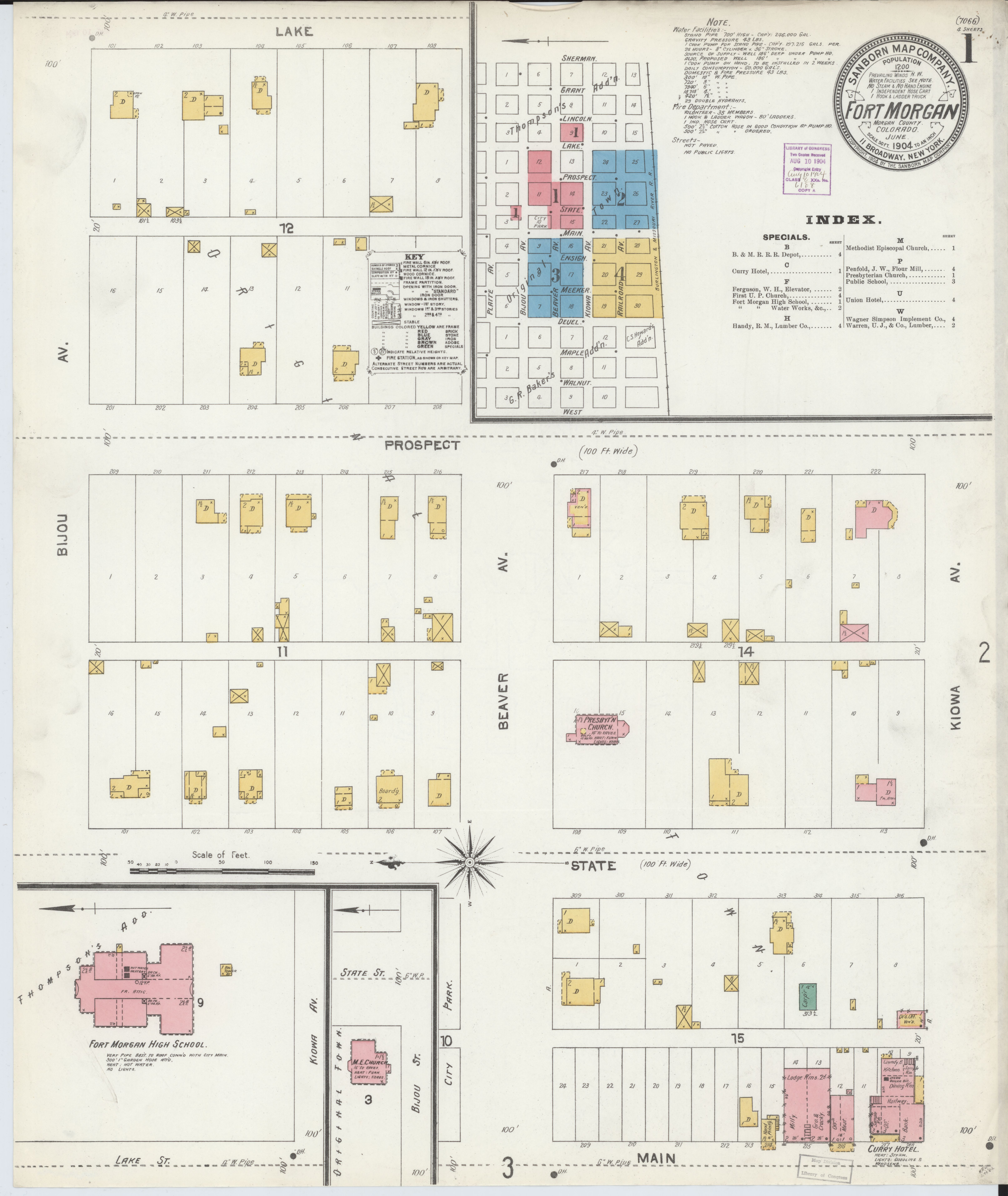
This 1904 map's top is east.

The orientation of a map is the compass direction toward the top of the map. (Note: The word "orientation" traces its origin to the belief of primitive peoples that the eastern direction was the basis for spatial organization.) Modern maps generally have a north-up orientation. (Note: Not all maps have a well-defined orientation. For example, many conic projections and polar azimuthal projections contain meridian lines that are not parallel, so the "up" compass direction varies throughout the map.) If a map has a non-north orientation (such as magnetic north up), the map will usually include a graphical indicator pointing to true north. An early map with a known orientation is an Akkadian Empire clay tablet with an east-up map, c. 2300 BCE. The orientation of ancient Egyptian maps is uncertain, but some may have been oriented south up. In ancient and medieval Europe, orientation varied, and many maps did not contain an explicit indication of their orientation. The archetypes of the Tabula Peutingeriana and Ptolemy's map probably were north up. Mappa mundi were oriented in all four cardinal directions. Many T and O maps were drawn with east at the top but some displayed west or south up.

=== Accessibility ===
Cartographers may consider accessibility factors when designing a map, particularly to support users who may have visual impairments or color blindness. For example, to accommodate red-green color blindness a map may follow these guidelines:

- Take advantage of varying lightness for red-orange-yellow hues.
- Avoid yellow-green which color-blind users may confuse with orange.
- When using a palette of colors to display values in a thematic map, avoid green and limit colors to red, orange, yellow, and blues.

An example of a thematic color palette that is suitable for red-green color blindness is this divergent color palette developed by Cynthia Brewer:

For visually impaired map users, tactile maps may be produced that consist of raised surfaces which a visually impaired person can feel with their fingers. Interactive maps can convey information via auditory or vibration feedback as the user moves a cursor across a digital map.

=== Auxiliary elements ===
This map positions the legend in the lower left; the publisher, title, and scale bar in the upper left; and four insets on the right. (Note: This map was published by Geoscience Australia in 2007.)

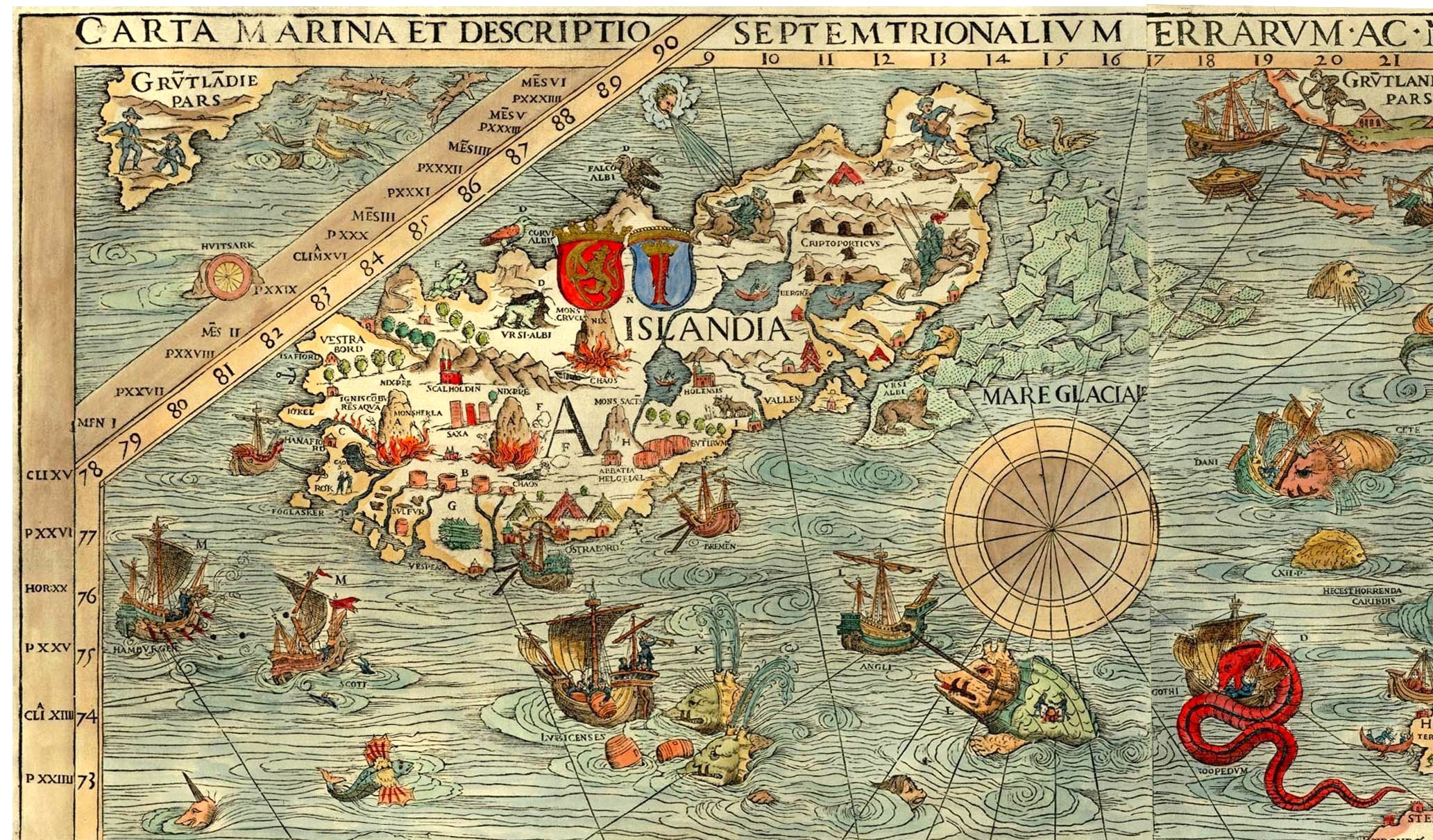
Mythical creatures were sometimes depicted in maps, such as this sea serpent (lower right) in this detail from the Carta marina (1539).

Maps often contain a variety of elements or marginalia that supplement the primary geographic imagery. A map scale is often indicated on a map, either textually or as a graphical scale bar. Many maps, particularly if their orientation is not north up, include an orientation indicator which points north. Titles are displayed in many maps, although some maps do not need a title and omit it.

Legends are a critical component of many maps, because they provide the user with essential keys to understanding the map. Legends define graphical symbols and can explain the origin, context, and meaning of the map's thematic data. Some maps contain smaller maps, called insets. The insets can serve a variety of purposes, such as showing the location of the primary map in global context or showing high-detail maps of points of interest.

A cartouche is an ornamental symbol – sometimes very elaborate – found on some maps that contains map marginalia such as the title or author's name. Some globes display an analemma – a figure-eight shaped line – that shows the locations on the Earth where the sun is directly overhead throughout the year.

Maps in antiquity sometimes displayed creatures such as sea serpents, mermaids, satyrs, sirens, dog-headed people, and centaurs. Dragons were sometimes included, leading to the creation of the phrase "here be dragons" to designate terra incognita (unmapped or unknown regions).

== Types ==
Maps can be classified in a variety of ways. The Applications section above describes classifications based on purpose, including geological maps, road maps, and cadastral maps. The Design section above lists classifications based on design attributes such as south-up maps, large-scale maps, and Mercator projection maps. All other classifications (that is, those not related to applications or design) are discussed in this section, including thematic maps, topographic maps, interactive maps, and topological maps.

=== Topographic ===
The topography of Mt. Everest is displayed in this pictorial map with a combination of shaded relief and oblique perspective.

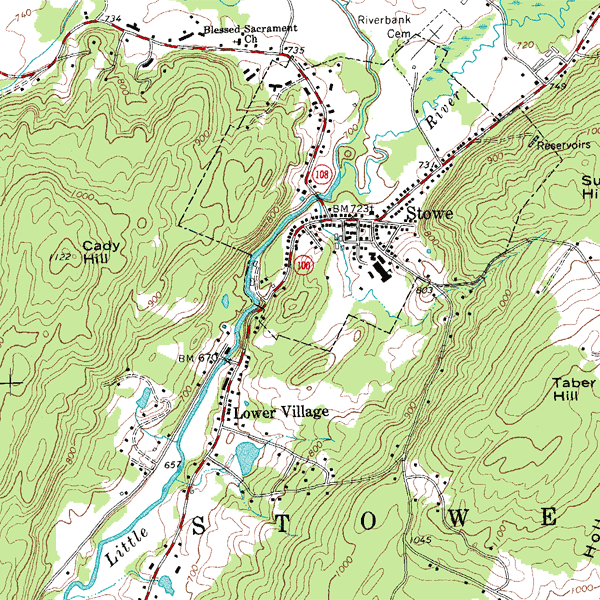
This topographic map displays elevation data as contour lines. (Note: This is a detail from a larger map. Interval between contour lines is 20 feet (6.1 m). Colors used in the image: brown for contour lines, buildings as black rectangles, forests as green-colored regions, and rivers in blue. Map published by USGS.)

Topographic maps depict the elevation (height) of the ground. The height – often expressed as elevation above sea level – can be displayed in a variety of ways, including contour lines or relief shading. Many topographic maps are general reference maps because – in addition to elevation – they may display a variety of features such as buildings, bodies of water, vegetation, roads, towns, and railways. Some national mapping agencies produce topographic maps of their countries' lands – including the UK's Ordnance Survey and the US's USGS. Some nations produce two or more series of topographic maps, each at a unique scale. For example, in the UK, topographic maps are produced at four scales: 1:1,250 (urban areas), 1:2,500 (rural areas), 1:10,000 (mountain and moorland areas), and 1:50,000 (the baseline series).

Planimetric maps – in contrast to topographic maps – do not include elevation information: they convey only horizontal location information.

=== Thematic ===
Thematic maps focus on depicting a specific type of information and relegate base geography to the background. Examples include maps depicting weather, population, and geological data. In contrast to thematic maps, general reference maps display a variety of basic geographic information about a region, typically focusing on towns, highways, railways, and bodies of water. Many maps have characteristics of both thematic maps and general reference maps, so these two map kinds are not mutually exclusive.

Symbolization techniques for thematic maps

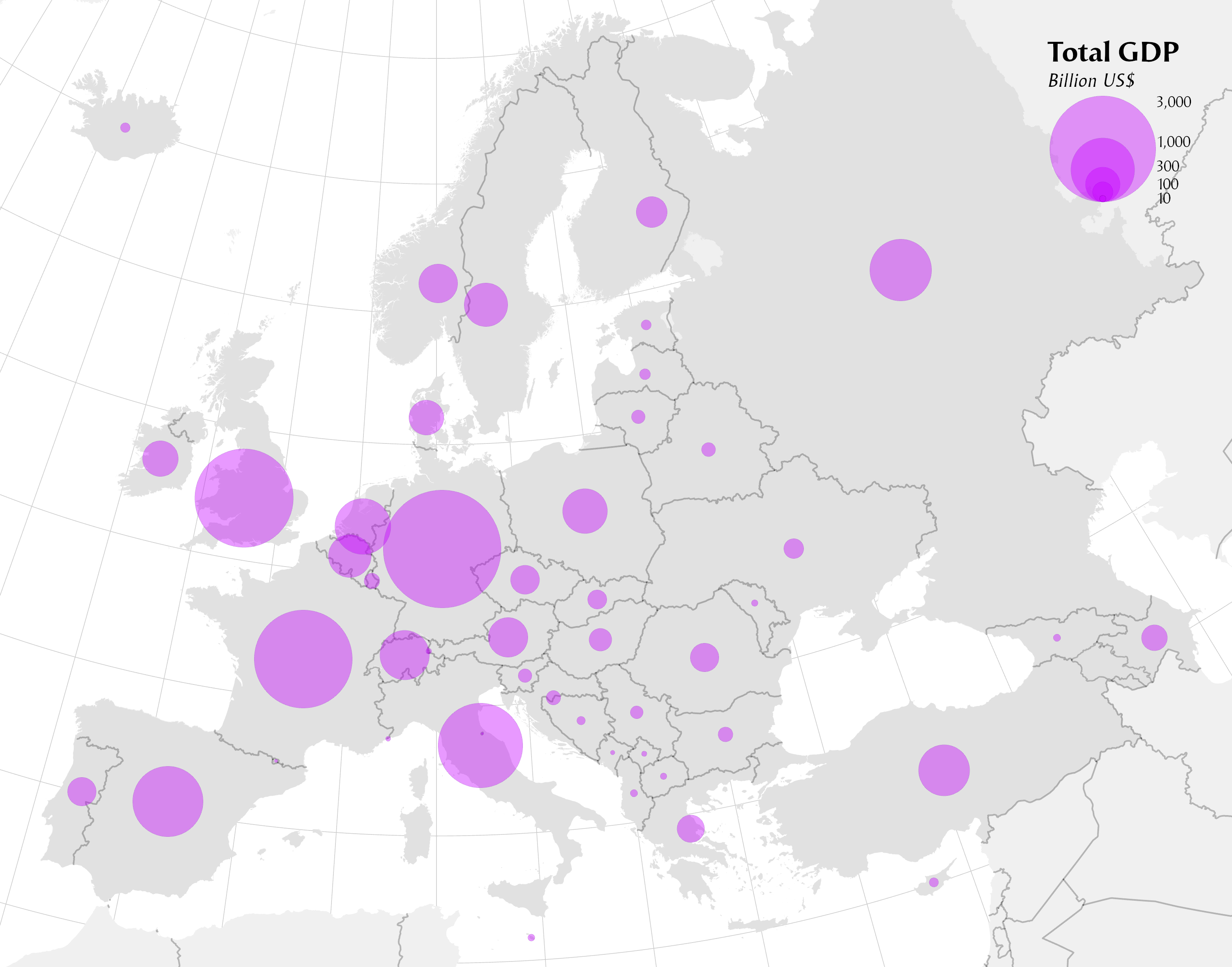
Proportional symbol (Note: Circle area proportional to each nation's GDP.)

Choropleth (Note: This map depicts the COVID-19 mortality rate in 2021 within the province of Cuzco, Peru.)

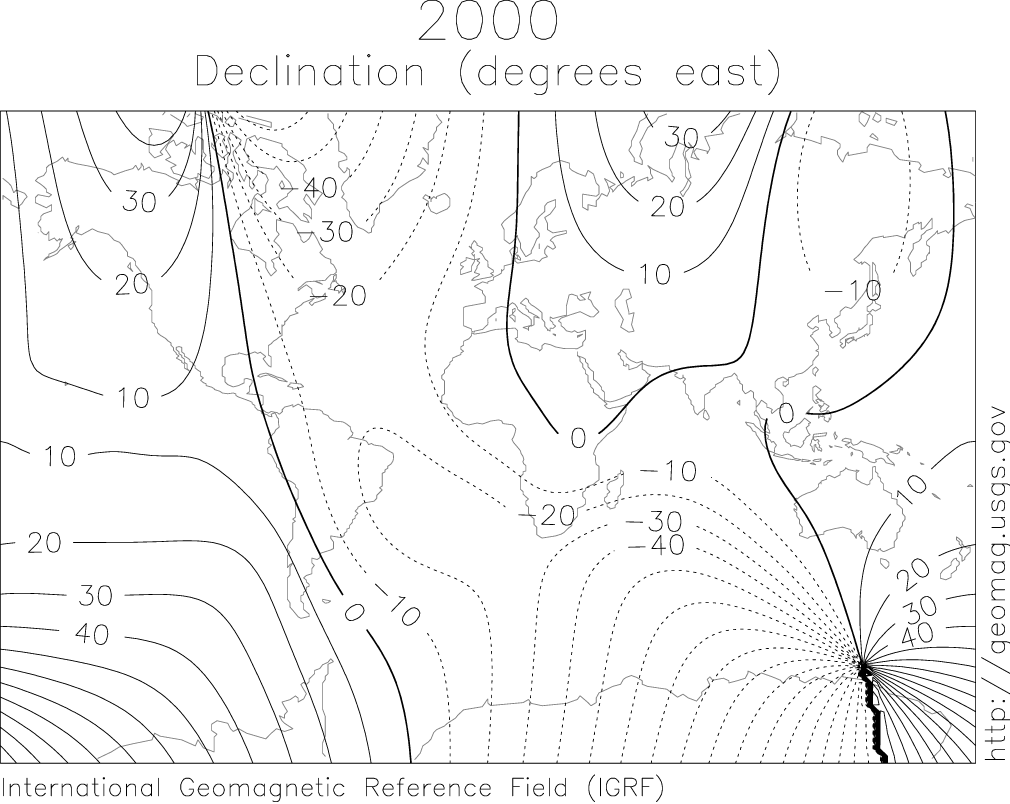
Isopleth (Note: Map shows magnetic declination (deviation from true north) in the year 2000. Interval between lines is 10 degrees. Map published by the USGS based on data from this paper.)

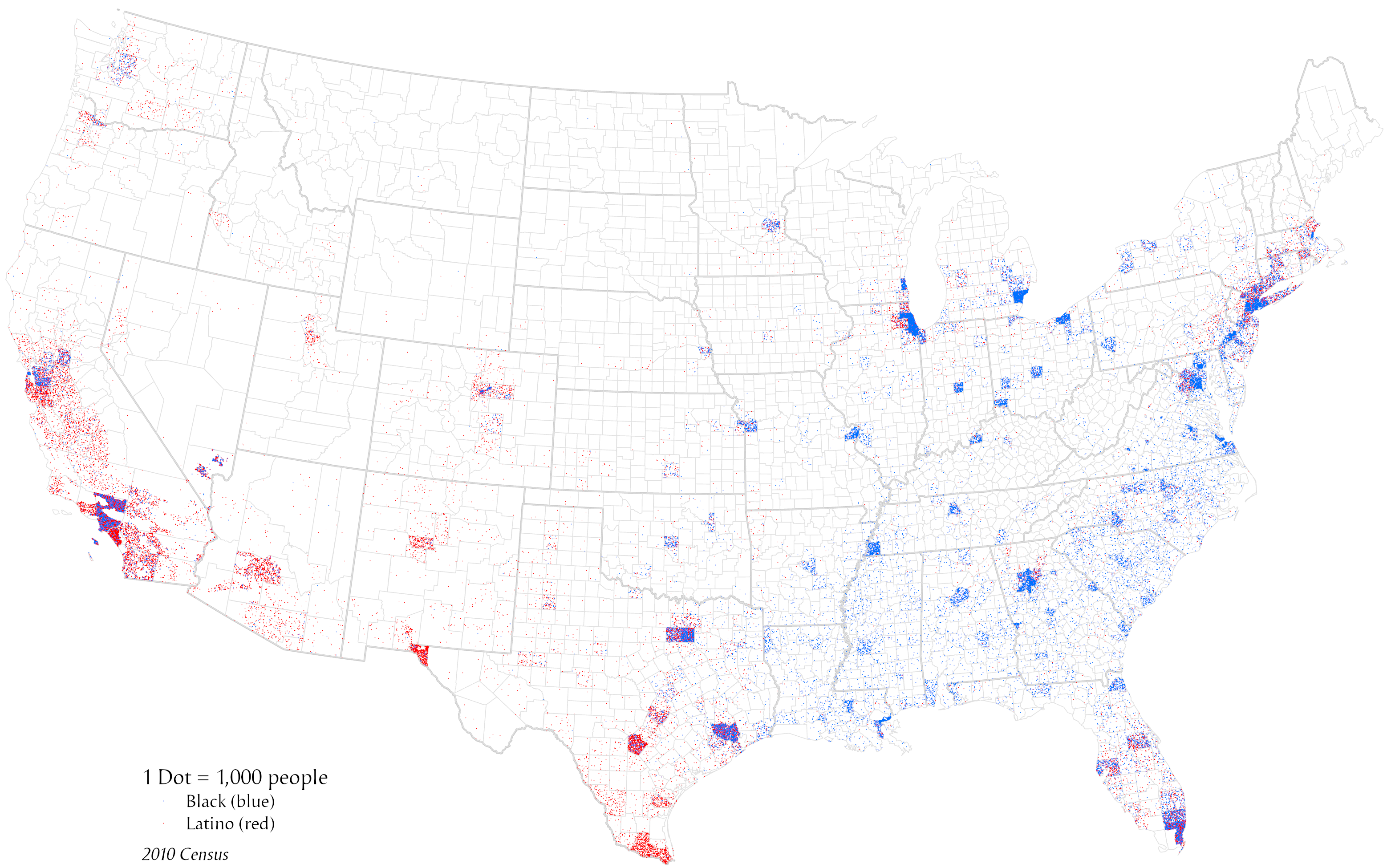
Dots (Note: Map of population density for two ethnicities in the US: red (Hispanic), blue (Black). Each dot represents 1,000 people. Data from 2010 US census.)

Symbolization techniques commonly used in thematic maps include:

- Proportional symbols – A map with multiple symbols (such as circles) depicting the datum being represented, with the area of each symbol proportional to the data's value.
- Lines of constant value (isopleth map) – Lines (usually closed loops) that follow constant values of the datum being represented. Also called "isarithmic map". Elevation contour lines are an example of isopleths.
- Dots (dot distribution map) – The datum is represented as dots (usually all the same size), where each dot typically represents a fixed quantity of the data.
- Colored areas (choropleth map) – A thematic map of an area composed of multiple regions (for example, administrative boundaries), each region colored with a single color, and the color variation (hue or lightness) indicates the value of the datum being represented. Choropleth maps often use areal borders that rigidly correspond to political or administrative data-collection boundaries.
- Colored areas (dasymetric map) – A dasymetric map is similar to a choropleth map, insofar as both represent data as colored regions. However, the dasymetric areal boundaries are based on multiple data sources, so the resultant areas may be more accurate and insightful than those based on a single data set. Additionally, areal boundaries of dasymetric maps typically do not rigidly adhere to administrative data-collection boundaries. (Note: An example of how a dasymetric map is produced from multiple data sets is illustrated in this image.)

=== Qualitative ===
This qualitative map divides Australia into discrete climate zones.

Some maps may be classified as qualitative or quantitative. A qualitative map (also called a chorochromatic map) depicts nominal data, which can be categorized as two or more kinds, but does not have a continuous numerical basis. Examples include a climate map that divides a region into 15 climate zones or a map that divides a region based on 20 religious affiliations. Some authorities limit the quantitative/qualitative distinction to thematic maps, but others apply the distinction to any maps that display numerical or statistical data.

=== Quantitative ===
This quantitative map of Africa divides per-nation forest biomass (per hectare) into six classes. (Note: This is a detail from a map published by Our World in Data based on 2020 data from United Nations Food and Agriculture Organization.)

A quantitative map displays the magnitude of a single numerical datum, such as air pressure, population density, or poverty rate. Some quantitative maps – particularly choropleth maps – display data as a set of distinct classes or categories. (Note: Not all quantitative maps divide data into classes: "classless choropleth maps" display continuous color gradations, where color value is proportional to the numerical data value.) For example, the adjacent map of Africa divides forest biomass density into six classes with dividing lines at:

- 50 tonnes
- 100 tonnes
- 150 tonnes
- 200 tonnes
- 250 tonnes

A careful choice of divisions between classes can make a map more useful and informative. The process of choosing the dividing lines between classes is called "classification". A variety of classification algorithms are available, including the quantile and equal-interval algorithms. (Note: The equal-interval algorithm rigidly spaces the dividing lines equally, such as ages 0‍–‍10, 11‍–‍20, 21‍–‍30, etc. Typically, the number of data samples in each class will vary. The quantile algorithm creates classes that have approximately the same number of data samples in each class; the dividing lines are typically not equally spaced. For example, the classes might be ages 0‍–‍15, 16‍–‍22, and 23‍–‍45, each containing 2,000 people.) The cartographer George F. Jenks created the natural breaks algorithm, which analyzes a histogram of the data and selects the low points of the histogram as the class dividing lines. People may have difficulty distinguishing colors if they are too similar, so at most eight classes should be used when displaying the classes with a simple color gradient.

=== Topological ===
Maps of London Underground

This topological map emphasizes understandability

This conventional map emphasizes accurate geography

A topological map is one that emphasizes graphical simplicity and makes little or no effort to accurately represent geographic distances or locations. (Note: Topological maps are not restricted to the field of cartography; they are commonly used in robotics as well.) The term "topological" means that these maps preserve topology in the mathematical sense: all connections or relationships between objects are preserved even after distances and positions are distorted. Topological maps are sometimes called "schematic maps" because of their diagrammatic nature: their graphical depictions promote comprehension by sacrificing geographic accuracy. (Note: The terms "topological map" and "schematic map" are both used in the field of cartography, with roughly the same meaning. The term "schematic" refers to maps in Robinson 1995 p. 534; Monmonier 2015 pp. 252, 1622; and in Kent & Vujakovic 2017 pp. 450–460. The term "topological" refers to maps in Monmonier 2015 p. 790. Robinson 1995 does not use the term "topological map" (but does mention topological properties of data). Monmonier 2015 also uses "semitopological" to indicate that some effort was made to preserve geographic accuracy.)

An early schematic map was a 4th-century Roman visual itinerarium (travel guide) that aided travelers by depicting roads and towns rather than their geographically accurate positions. The original was lost, but its contents are preserved in the Tabula Peutingeriana – a copy made c. 14th century. A notable modern example of a topological map is the official London Underground map. (Note: The 1933 Beck London tube map is considered by some to be a masterpiece of modernist design.)

=== Cartogram ===
This cartogram of China distorts the area of each province (and Taiwan) to be proportional to the population of the region. (Note: Population data is from 2020. Data source is United Nations Office for the Coordination of Humanitarian Affairs.)

A cartogram is a thematic map that depicts a data value by enlarging or shrinking regions so the area of each region is proportional to the region's data value. Cartograms are diagrammatic or schematic in nature and do not attempt to display geographic sizes or distances accurately. Cartograms are a kind of topological map because cartograms typically preserve the positional relationships (that is, the topology) between regions.

Cartograms can be beneficial when regions with a small geographic area have a medium or large data value: in a conventional map, such regions may be nearly invisible, but in a cartogram they are prominent. By definition, data density is constant throughout the entire cartogram. For example, a cartogram showing the population of countries would have the same population density (people per unit area on the map) in all countries. Creating a cartogram that retains the positional relationships between regions can be a complex process requiring sophisticated algorithms.

=== Interactive ===
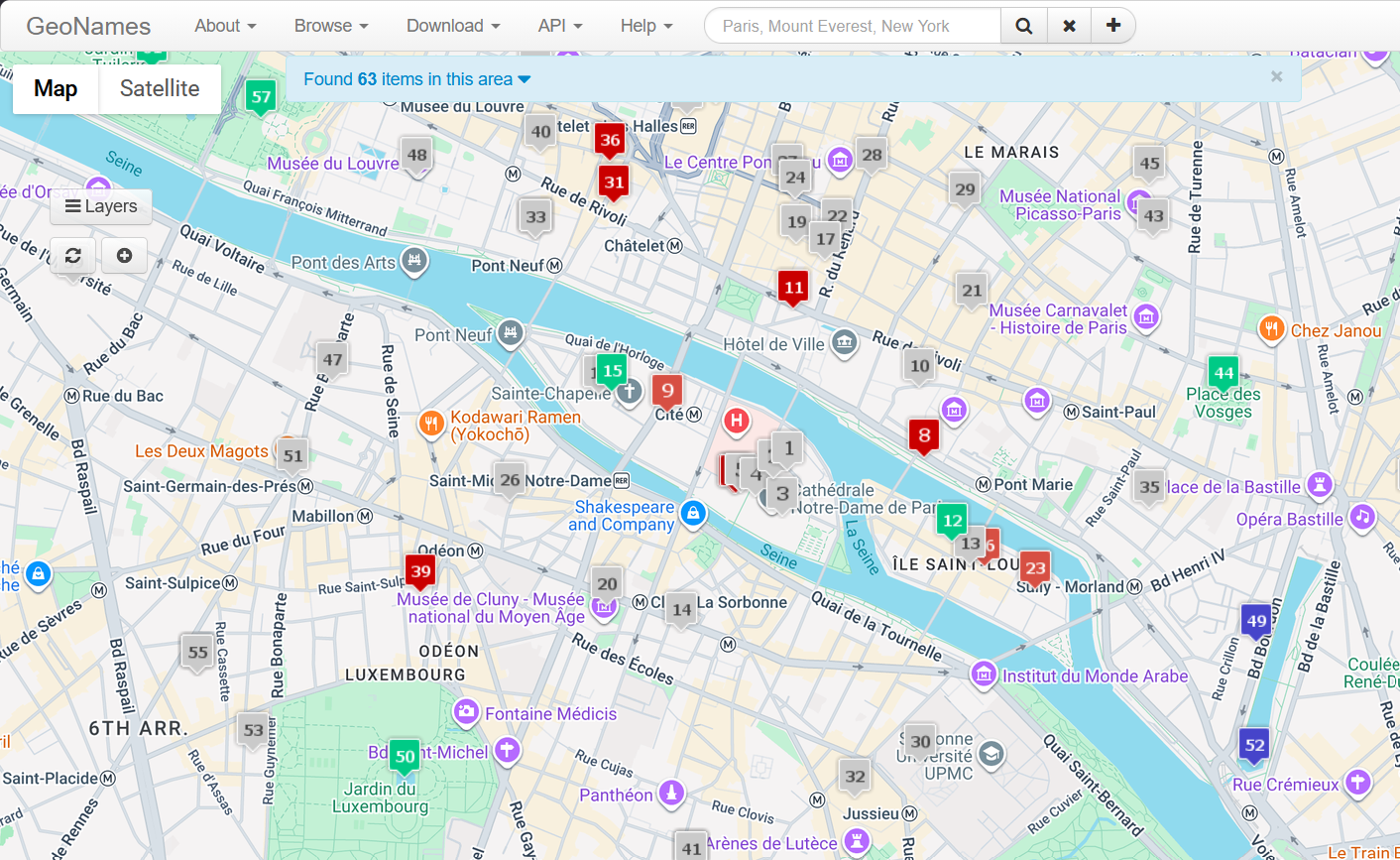
The GeoNames web app lets users interactively view and manipulate maps.

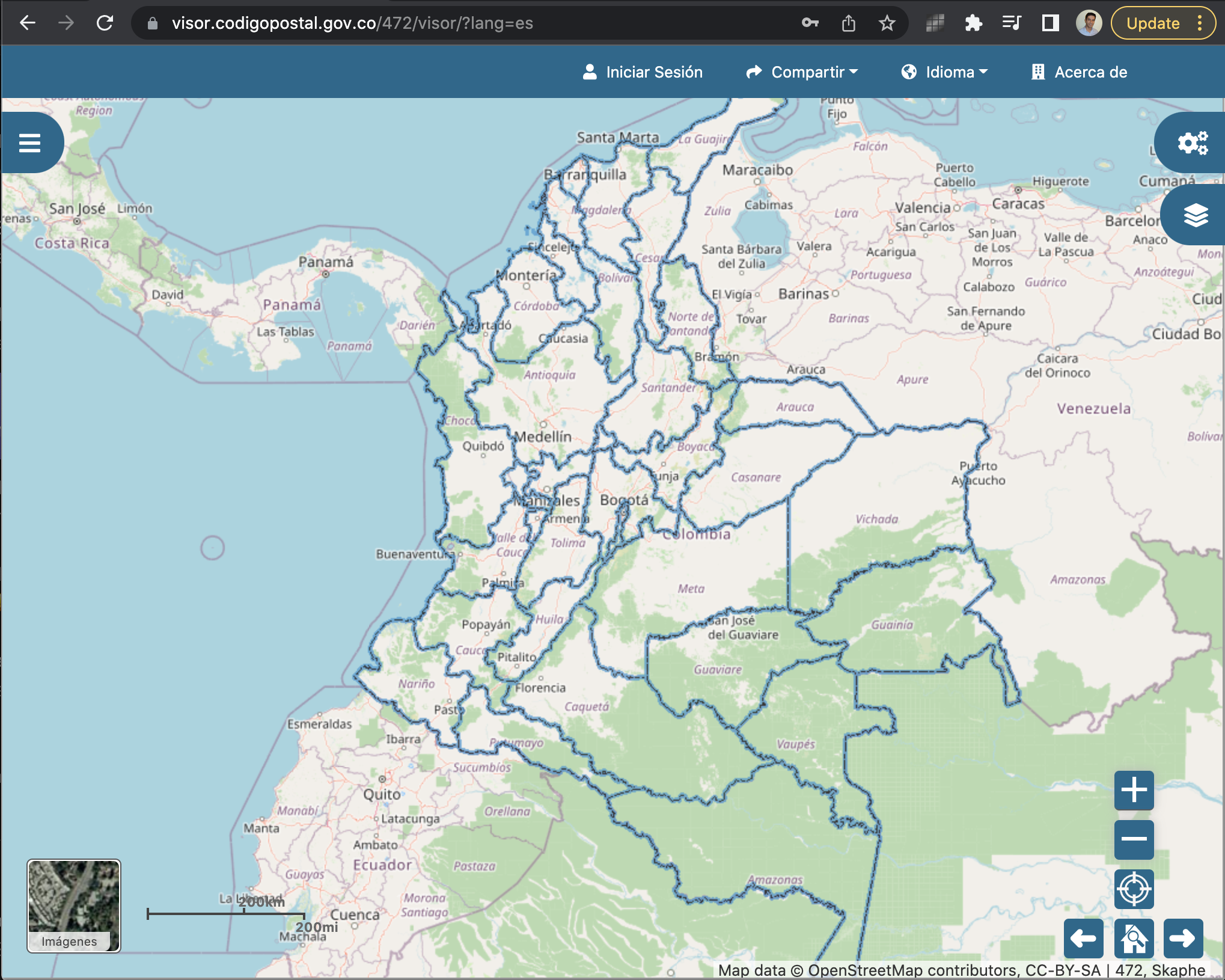
This interactive map of postal codes uses geographic data from OpenStreetMap.

The spread of computers in the latter decades of the 20th century led to a new kind of map: interactive maps, which dynamically display geographic data on an electronic visual display. These maps allow users to view and explore the data by directly interacting with the map. Interactive maps permit users to select which features to display, view details of individual objects, zoom in and out, and adjust the map scale. These manipulations of content or appearance are in contrast to the limited interactions available with a paper map. Interactive maps can also display the Earth as a globe, with no map projection applied. Interactive maps are often used, especially on mobile devices, to provide location-based services, such as providing navigation directions.

=== Photomap ===
This orthophotomap of Spain is overlaid with elevation contour lines, drawn in white.

A photomap is a georeferenced image that has graphics overlaid to make it usable as a map. The image may consist of several individual images that were combined into a mosaic. The overlaid graphics may include grid lines, descriptive notes, or other marginalia.

When an image has been orthorectified to remove distortion due to terrain relief, it is called an orthophoto, and when supplemented with graphics to be suitable as a map, it is an orthophotomap. After images have been orthorectified, two or more images can be merged into a larger orthophotomosaic. An orthophoto (or orthophotomosaic) can be used as the background (basemap) of a map.

=== Astronomical ===
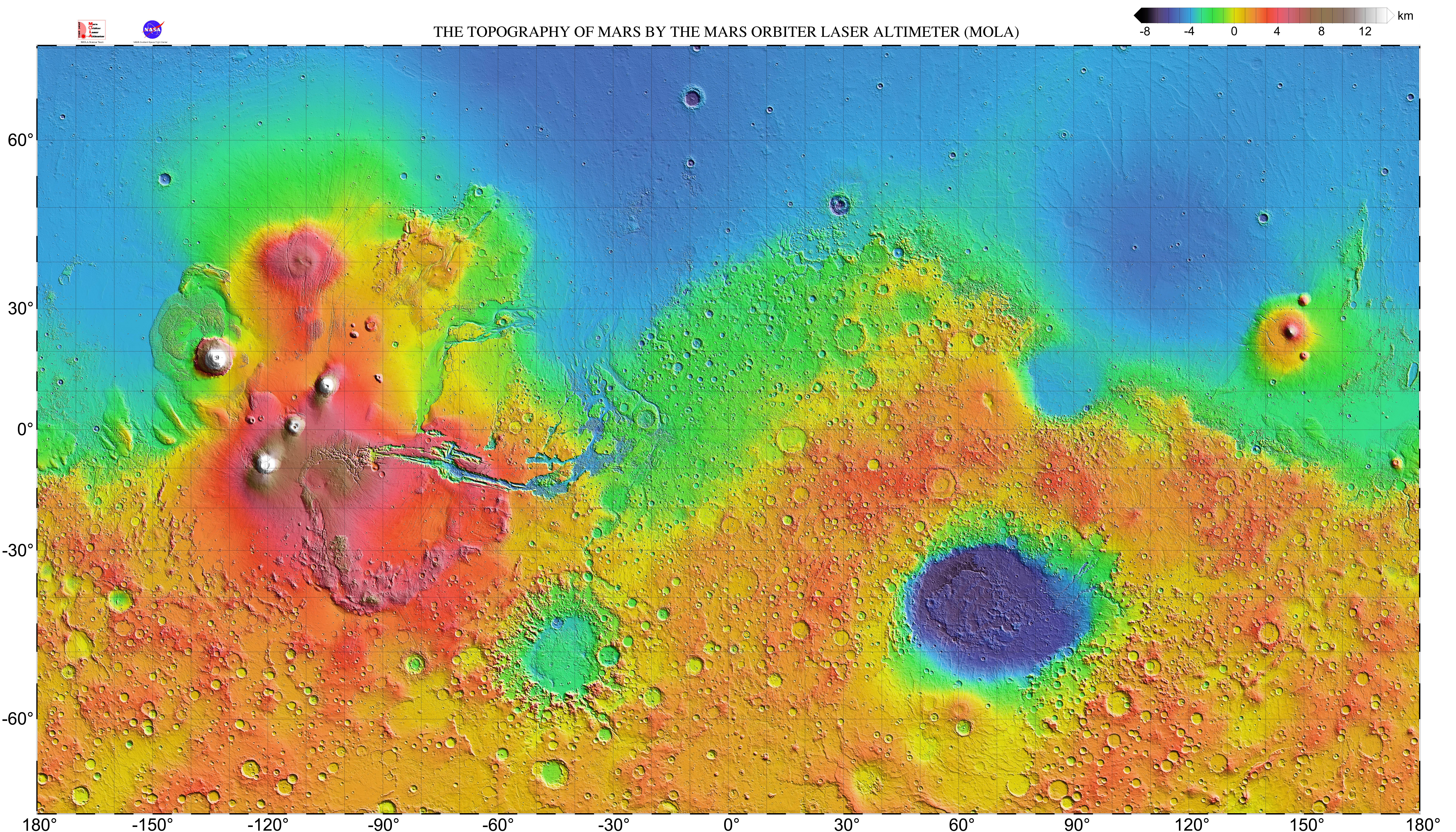
A topographic map of Mars, which uses colors to indicate the elevation of the surface.

Astronomers have produced maps of celestial objects for centuries, with telescopic observations enabling increasingly detailed maps of planets, moons, asteroids, and comet nuclei. Early maps were of objects that appear relatively large through a telescope, such as Mercury, Mars, and the Moon. Maps of the Moon played an important role in the Space Race during the 1960s and 1970s, including the Apollo program, which landed the first humans on the Moon. Some astronomical objects – such as the Sun and gas planets like Jupiter – do not have solid surfaces. Nevertheless, they have been mapped to depict their visible features at particular points in time. Some asteroids and comet nuclei have shapes so irregular that conventional map projections designed for spheroidal objects are not sufficient. Maps for these objects required the invention of novel map projections. Astronomers map the location of stars and other celestial objects with star charts, some of which incorporate distance from Earth as a third spatial dimension.

=== Classified by medium ===
Maps may be classified according to the medium in which they are presented. Until the 21st century, most maps were printed as individual sheets of paper. An atlas is a collection of maps bound as a book. Globes are three-dimensional representations of the Earth, Moon, or other celestial bodies. Maps may also be produced as physical three-dimensional raised-relief models. Such models depict topography and can be made of vinyl, plaster, or papier-mâché. With the development of digital technology, maps increasingly became available in electronic formats. A digital map is stored as computer data and is typically displayed on an electronic visual display such as a computer monitor or smartphone. It may depict the Earth in a two-dimensional representation or as a three-dimensional globe.

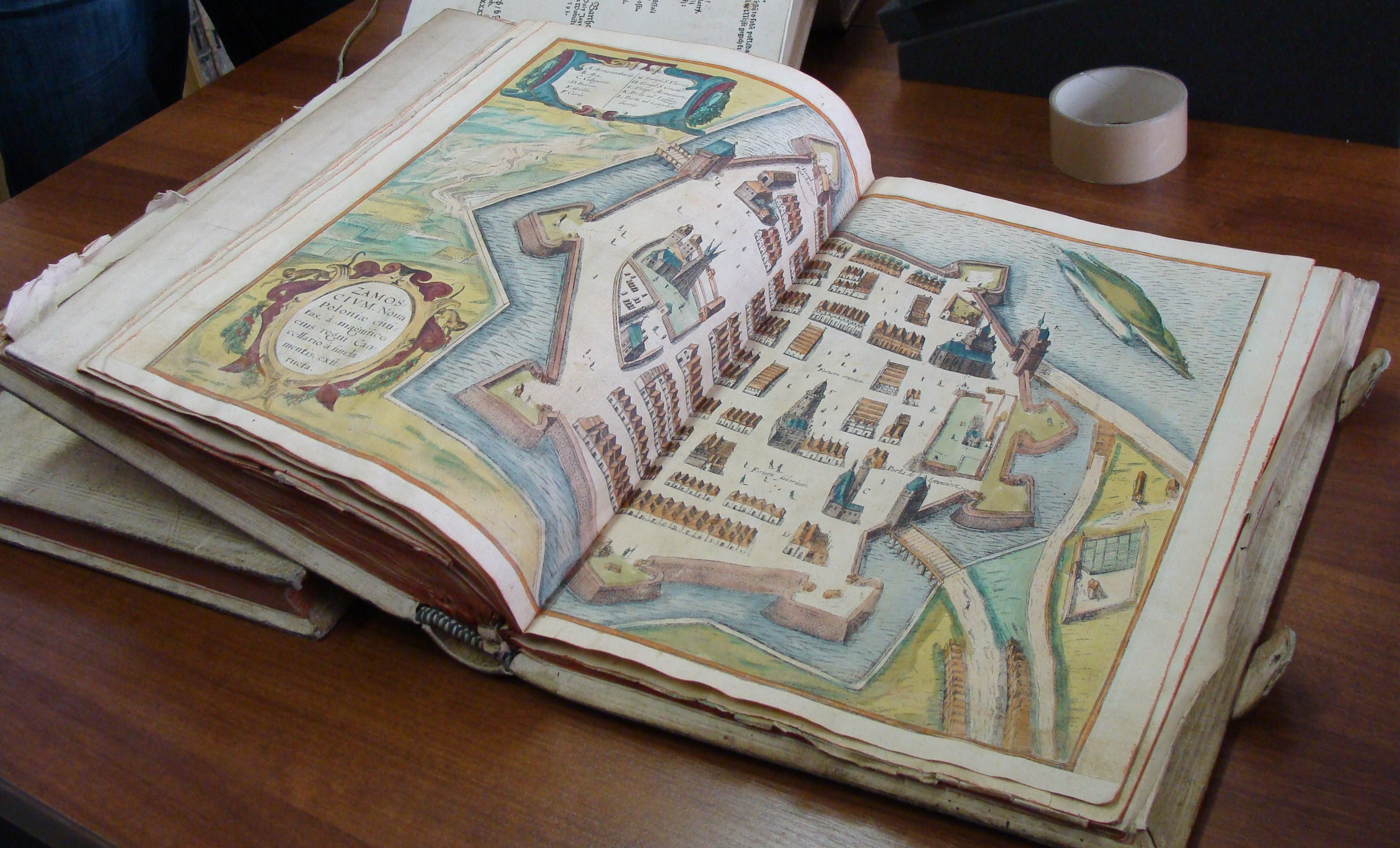
An atlas is a collection of maps, usually in book form.

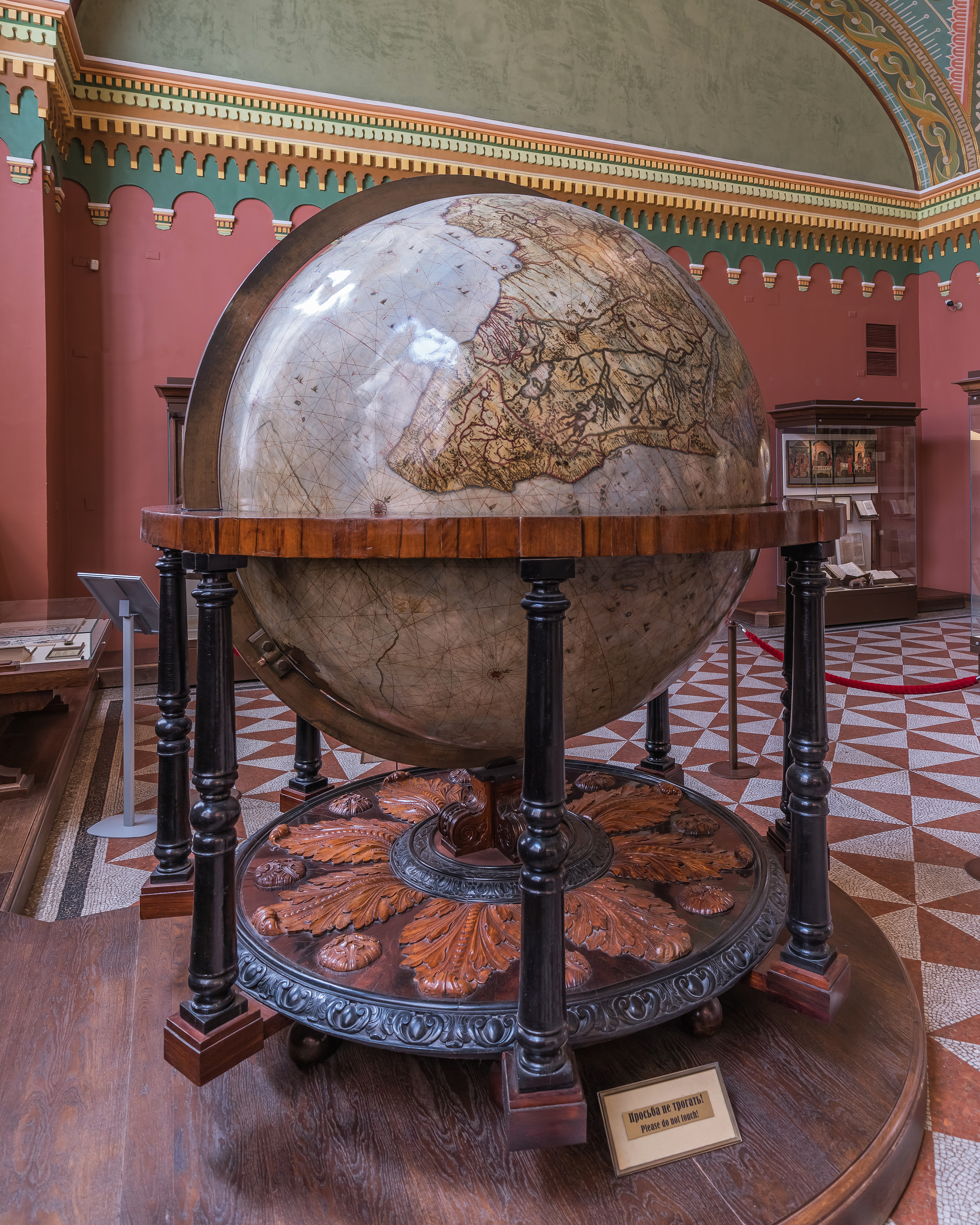
A globe made by Willem Blaeu in the early 1600s

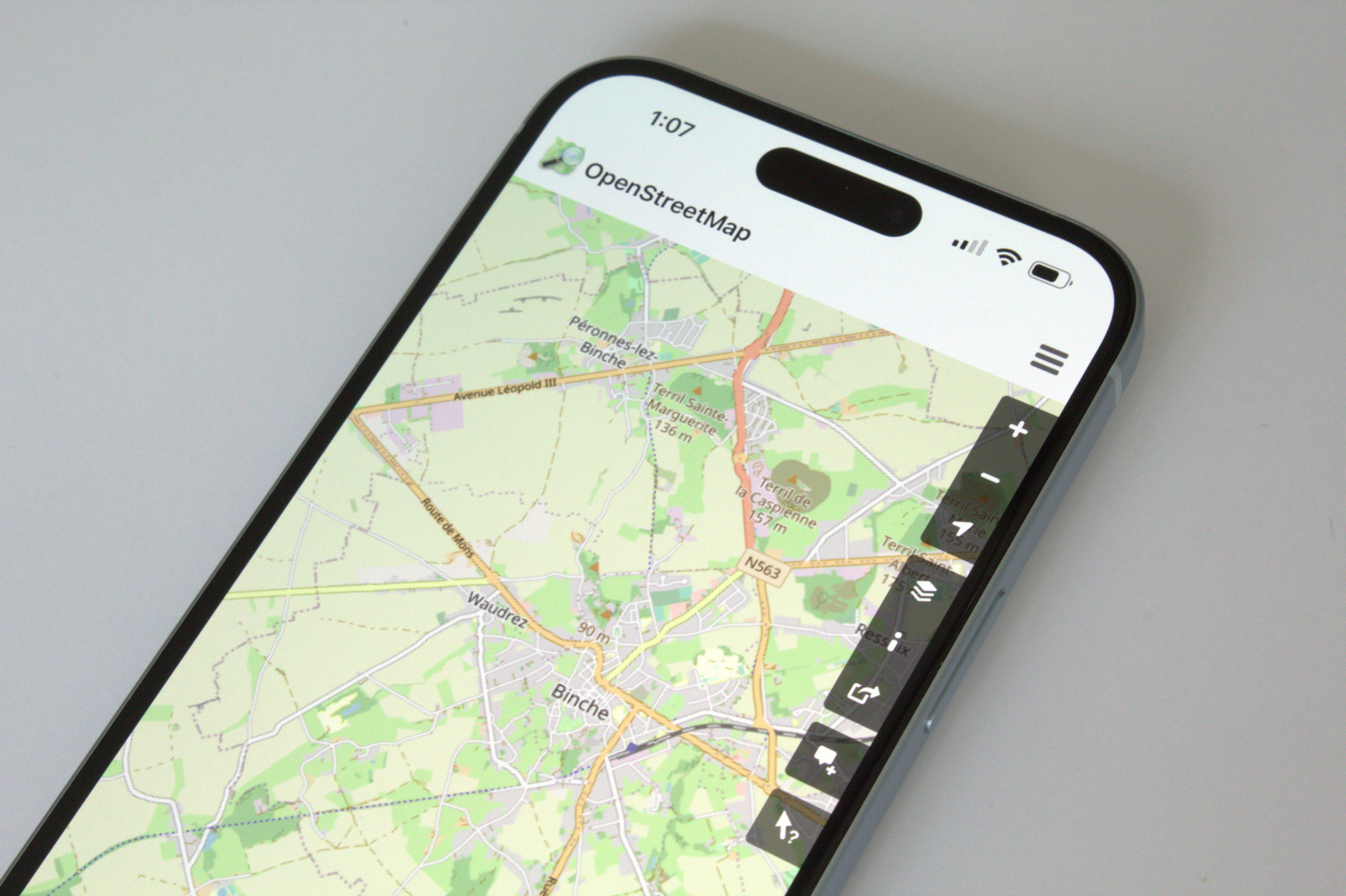
Digital maps are often displayed on smartphones.

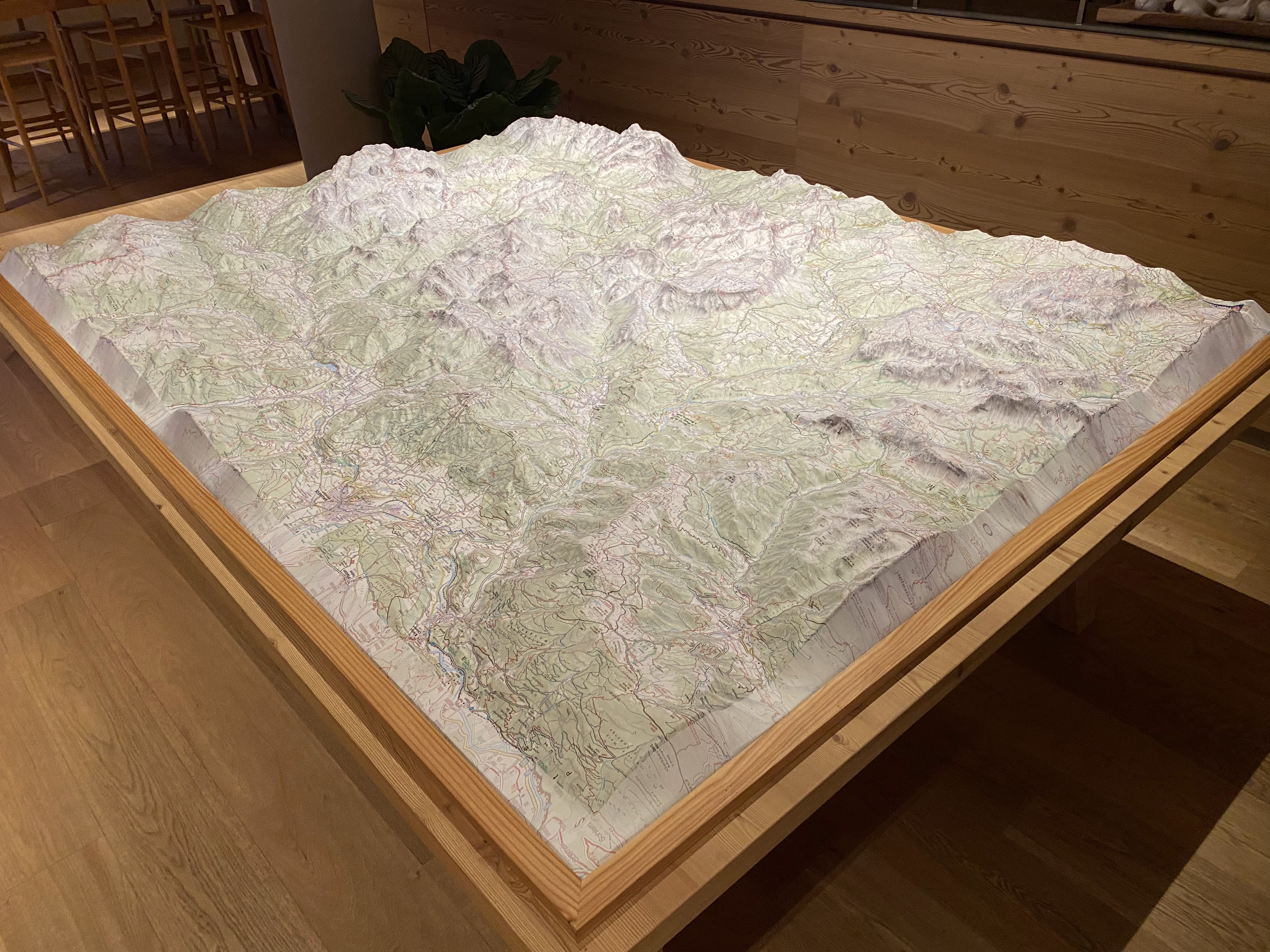
A raised-relief map made of plastic

== Cartographic data ==
To create a new map, a cartographer must obtain and assemble geographic data. Geographic data used for mapmaking includes imagery or photographs from airplanes or from satellites, (Note: In cartography, the words "imagery", "photo", and "photograph" may be used interchangeably to mean any image of the Earth, in any spectral band(s), taken by any camera, scanner, or sensing device, mounted on any platform (airplane, drone, or satellite). Some older uses of "photo" or "photograph" were limited to film-based images, and the term "aerial photograph" sometimes meant images collected from cameras mounted in airplanes. Sensors may be categorized as passive (images from EM radiation such as visible light, IR, UV, etc.) or active (the sensor emits a signal and collects the reflection, such as radar, sonar, and lidar). The word "imagery" is sometimes used only for data collected from passive sensors, but the phrase "remote sensing" or "remote sensing imagery" may include both passive and active sensors.) rectified imagery, existing maps, surveying data, geographic features (buildings, roads, railways, water features, etc.), and terrain (elevation) data. A cartographer may find some of the needed data in existing databases. Alternatively, the mapmaker may need to obtain new data by collecting imagery, finding and digitizing existing paper maps, or extracting feature or terrain data from existing imagery or maps. Cartographic data can be used not only to create new maps but also to revise existing ones. For instance, recent satellite imagery can be overlaid on an existing map, allowing a cartographer to visually determine whether any roads or buildings need to be added or changed.

=== Cartographic databases ===
Cartographers store cartographic data in databases. A database dedicated to storing data for mapmaking is called a cartographic database. Another type of database that contains cartographic data is a geographic information system: a computer system that stores and analyzes geographic data. (Note: Robinson, in 1995, distinguished a cartographic database from a GIS database by limiting cartographic databases to data obtained by digitizing paper maps and other analog data. In that interpretation, GIS databases contained true geographic locations, whereas cartographic databases contained locations that may have been subject to a generalization process. Thus, according to Robinson, in a cartographic database some features may have inaccurate locations because the cartographer who created the original map moved the features away from their true (more accurate) location to achieve certain map design goals. Data that has been subject to a generalization process are best displayed at scales ranging from 0.5 to 2.0 times the scale suggested by the data's resolution.) GISs can contain a wide variety of data to support many different applications, including cartography, real estate, engineering, architecture, urban planning, environmental protection, transport, and logistics.

=== Georeferencing ===
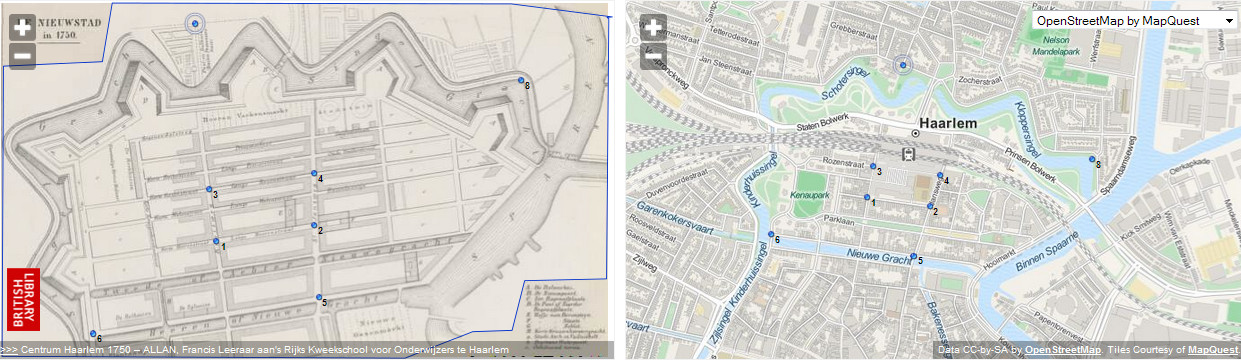
The drawing on the left can be georeferenced by finding corresponding points (numbered 1 to 8) in an already georeferenced map (right).

Cartographic data must be georeferenced before it can be displayed on a map. Data is georeferenced when information is available to compute the geographic locations of places represented in the data. (Note: The term "metric georeferencing" is sometimes used for data associated with geographic positions, to distinguish it from looser forms of location, such as postal codes or street addresses.) Some data may be georeferenced when it is originally collected, such as surveying data, or imagery that was collected by a craft equipped with satellite navigation and an inertial measurement unit. (Note: The term "direct georeferencing" means that the georeferencing happened when the data was originally collected.) When a map incorporates data from multiple sources, the data may not be georeferenced with the same coordinate system, units, or scales. In that situation, the mapmaker must convert the data to a common reference system.

To utilize data that is not yet georeferenced, several techniques are available. If the data contains identifiable landmarks or objects, georeferencing may be possible by matching the landmarks to their corresponding locations in an already georeferenced map or image. Data may be georeferenced by sending a surveying crew to visit the real-world location to obtain precise geographic locations of the objects represented in the data. Imagery and aerial photographs may be georeferenced with photogrammetric procedures such as image rectification.

=== Imagery and remote sensing ===
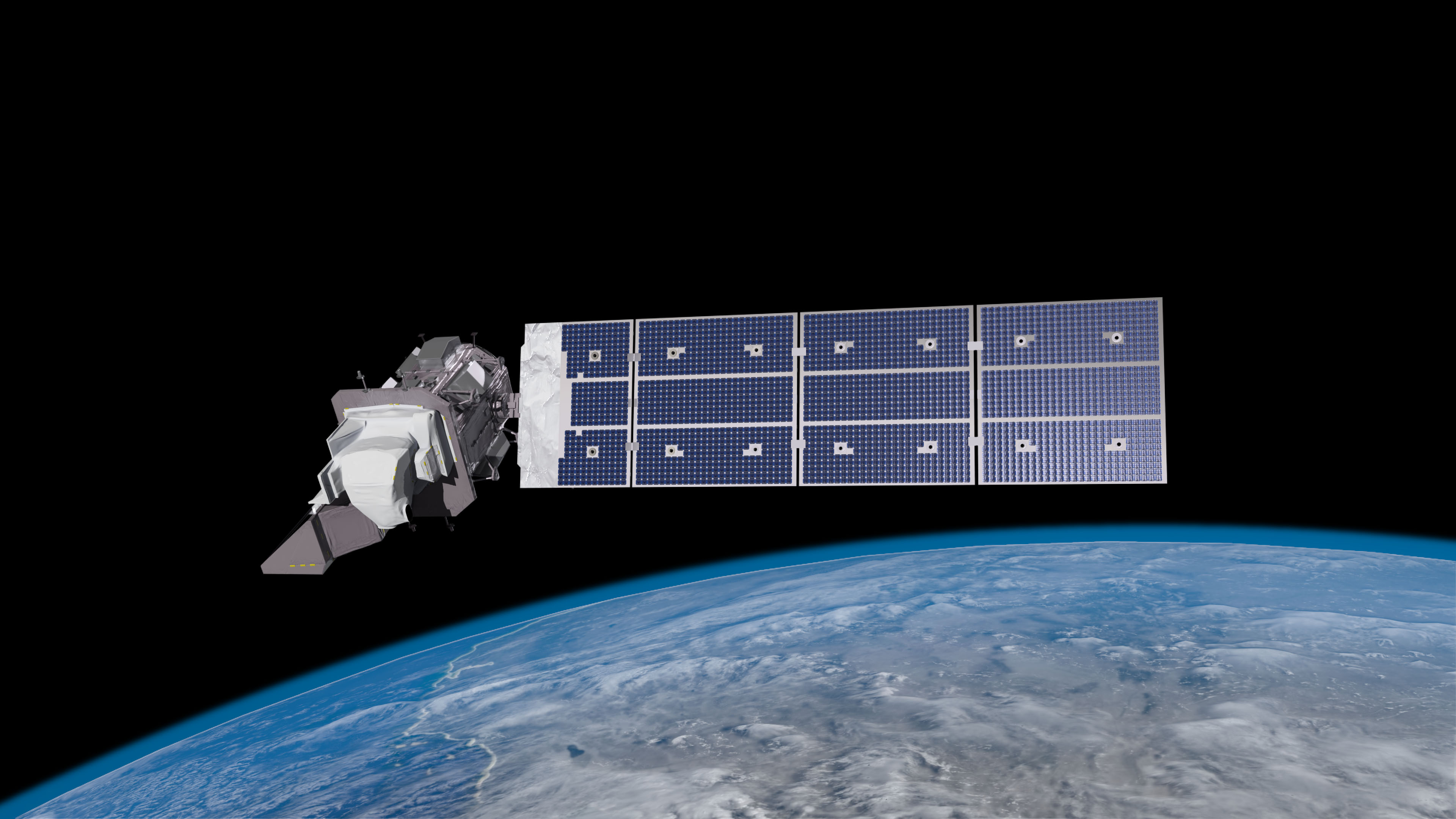
Cartographers can produce maps from imagery obtained with remote sensing technologies, such as the Landsat 9 satellite shown in this artist's rendering.

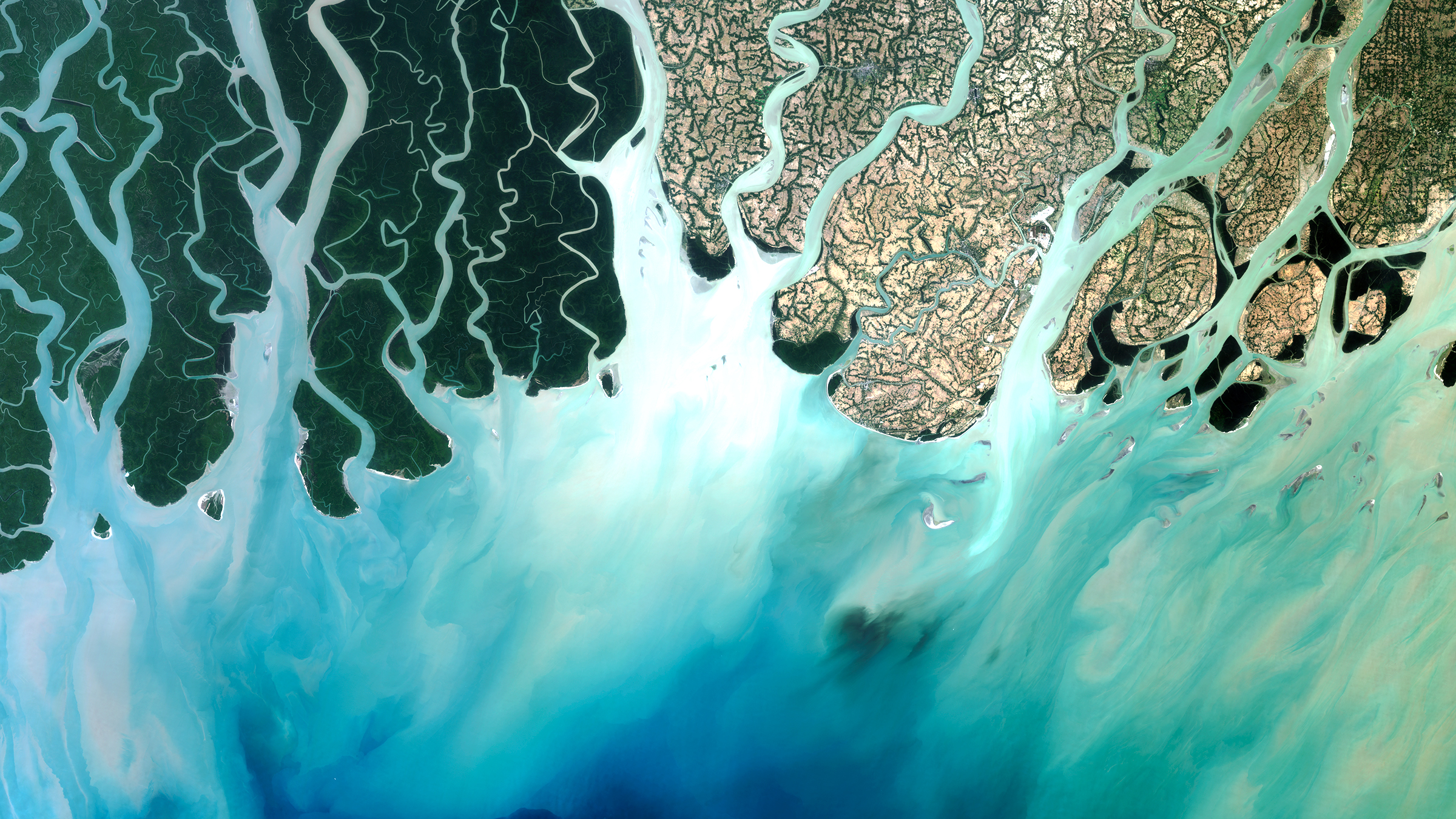
This photograph of Bangladesh comprises 3 of the 11 spectral bands collected by Landsat 9.

An important source of cartographic data is imagery collected from remote sensing, including satellite imagery and aerial photographs taken from cameras mounted on aircraft or drones. Remote sensing collects data from various signals: the electromagnetic spectrum (visible light, ultraviolet, infrared, microwave); as well as lidar, sonar, or radar reflections. Some imagery contains multiple spectral bands. This multispectral or hyperspectral imagery can be exploited by algorithms to extract information about conditions on the Earth's surface that are not possible with a single band. Applications of remote sensing extend far beyond cartography and include change detection, forestry, agriculture, farming, vegetation analysis, geology and Earth sciences, and hydrology.

Before imagery can be used for mapmaking, it must be georeferenced using principles of photogrammetry. One way to georeference an image is to locate several small, identifiable points in the image (such as street intersections, or small landmarks) that have a known geographic location which may be obtained through traditional surveying; or from satellite navigation measurement; or from a map or orthophoto that has been georeferenced.

Provided that the imagery has been properly georeferenced, it can be used to extract precise geographic coordinate values for any identifiable objects in the image. (Note: To determine the three-dimensional location of a feature in imagery, two overlapping images (from two vantage points) must be used. If only a single image is available, the position can be determined to only two degrees of freedom.) For example, a cartographer can extract the locations of terrain and feature data (such as rivers, roads, and buildings) for storage in a database.

=== Rectified imagery ===
Before imagery can be used in a map, it is usually orthorectified with terrain data.

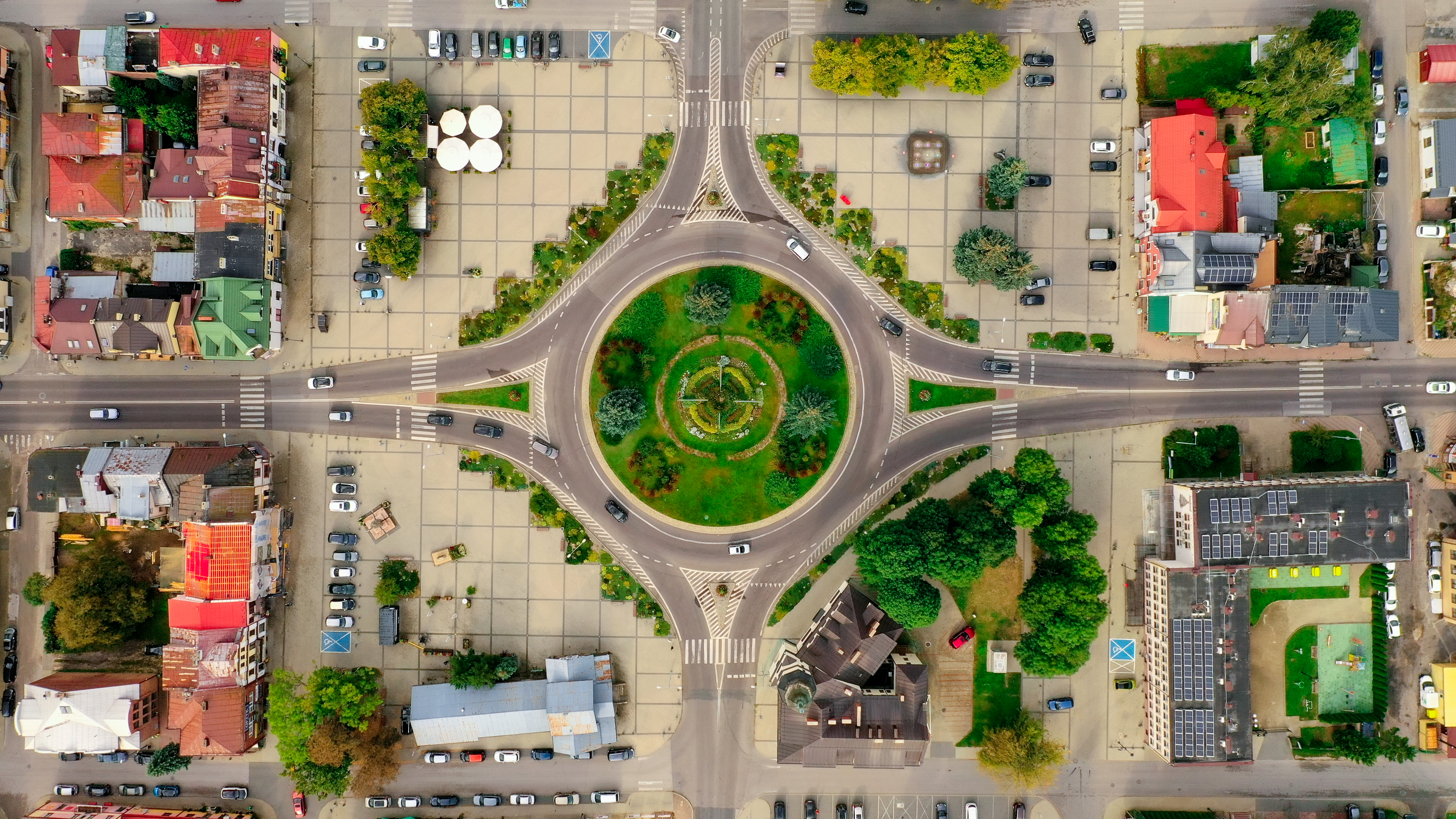
This is not a "true orthophoto", because the buildings were not modeled in the database. Thus, the buildings appear tilted.

Many images used in cartography undergo an additional processing step called orthorectification, which requires accurate digital terrain data covering the region. The orthorectification process geometrically warps imagery to remove terrain-related distortions and foreshortening caused by camera tilt (illustrated in the adjacent diagram). The orthophoto approximates what an imaginary viewer would see if they were directly above, looking straight down. The positions of features in an orthophoto are geographically correct, (Note: The accuracy of an orthophoto depends on the accuracy of the terrain data used and the accuracy of the camera's location and orientation.) and an orthophoto can serve as a background basemap within a map, or as a map itself, called an "orthophotomap".

If imagery contains buildings, orthorectification may produce orthophotos in which the buildings appear to be tilted or leaning. If that is not acceptable for the map, the mapmaker can generate "true orthophotos" that rectify buildings and other structures so they appear as if the viewer were looking straight down from directly above. Rectifying structures requires that they be modeled either within the terrain database, or separately from the terrain as 3D wireframe models. (Note: Some terrain databases – termed Digital elevation models (DEM) or digital surface models (DSM) – pass under buildings, at ground level. Other terrain databases pass over the rooftops of buildings, and consider the buildings to be part of the terrain. 3D wireframe models of buildings or structures are called "digital building models" (DBM).)

=== Searching and indexing ===
To efficiently locate geographic data in a database, special technologies may be used, such as an R-tree index (shown).

Cartographic data may be roughly grouped into three categories: spatial, temporal, and attributes (which include all other information about features or terrain, including metadata). Depending on the nature of the map being created, a cartographer may limit data searches to one or more of those data categories. For example, a mapmaker could query a database for railway data covering Sri Lanka in 1990, including the track gauge of each railway segment.

During the map design process, cartographers must locate relevant data within a database. Databases support that need with indexes, which provide retrieval, searching, and sorting functions. Indexes used to search and sort geographic data (that is, spatial data) require special computer technologies, because spatial data is not comparable to simple numerical or textual data.

=== Raster and vector data ===
Cartographic data that models the real world is often stored in raster format or vector format. Imagery is commonly stored in a raster format. Linear or areal features (such as roadways, boundaries, or building outlines) are typically stored as vector data. Terrain data is commonly stored in a raster format, although it may also be stored as a triangular irregular network. Terrain data, by itself, can be used by cartographers to derive important geographic information such as elevation contour lines, drainage basins, line-of-sight, drainage divides, viewsheds, volume of filled depressions, and watercourses.

To perform certain kinds of analysis, the data is transformed from one form to another. Software algorithms exist that automatically detect lines, edges, and boundaries within imagery and generate vector data that roughly delineates roads, buildings, and other linear or areal objects.

Spatial relationships between nearby objects can be explicitly stored with the objects' vector data in a database. This geospatial topology data can encode whether two features overlap, one is inside another, they share a boundary line, or if they are connected, as well as hierarchical relationships such as which road segments make up a particular roadway. (Note: Topological relationships between data in a cartographic database should not be confused with topological maps.) (Note: Vector data stored without topological relationships is sometimes disparagingly referred to as "spaghetti data".)

=== Attributes and metadata ===
When storing geographic data in a cartographic database, attributes or metadata may be useful to mapmakers. Attributes include the year the geographic data was collected, identification numbers, geodetic datum, error estimates, the origin or source of the data, and any miscellaneous notes. Attributes can be used, for example, to supply annotations for the map or notes in the map's legend.

=== Accuracy ===
==== Terminology ====
These black dots are not very accurate, because they are far from the center of the bullseye. But they are relatively precise, because the granularity of their positions is small.

Accuracy and precision have distinct meanings in cartography: accuracy is an estimate of error between an object's true location and its location presented in the map. Precision (Note: Precision is sometimes called resolution.) is the granularity (or resolution) of location values in the map (irrespective of their proximity to the true location). Some cartographers stipulate that the precision of a map is the real-world distance represented by half a millimeter (on a paper map) or by half a pixel (in raster imagery).

A related term is "detectable size", which is the width of the smallest discernible feature in a map, generally considered to be twice the precision. Tobler's Rule states that the detectable size (in meters) times 1000 is equal to the map scale.

==== Accuracy estimates ====
For some cartographic applications (for example, military targeting) it is essential to have an estimate of the spatial accuracy. The magnitude of the cumulative error can increase each time that geographic data is processed, manipulated, or converted (such as from one coordinate system to another). One source of inaccuracies in a map is the passage of time: a map may be accurate when created, but as years pass, new structures may be built, old structures demolished, and roads rerouted.

Ideally, the accuracy of data and features on a map is communicated to the user, for example, in the map legend. There is no international standard specifying how accurate maps should be. Some individual nations regulate maps produced by their own government agencies to ensure accuracy, consistency, and conformity. In 1947, the US government established a standard that the horizontal error of 95% of sampled points should be less than 0.85 mm (measured on the map) for paper maps of scale 1:20,000 or finer. In 1998, the US changed its guidance to eliminate a maximum error value, and instead specify that cartographers should estimate an error value (with a specified algorithm) and include the error estimate with the map. (Note: The 1947 US specification was the National Map Accuracy Standard. The 1998 specification is the National Standard for Spatial Data Accuracy.) (Note: Geographer Paul Longley suggested a rule of thumb that horizontal positional errors are roughly equal to a map's precision.)

Interactive maps may allow users to update or add to shared geographic data as a form of crowdsourcing. Cartographers who use crowdsourced data may need to assess its accuracy to ensure it meets quality requirements.

== Publication and distribution ==
The final steps in map production include publication and distribution. For paper maps, a printing facility must be used to produce copies. For digital maps, the cartographer must consider the device on which maps are viewed, particularly the size of its screen, the screen resolution, and the viewing distance. These factors must be addressed early in the design process. A variety of platforms are available to disseminate digital maps, including websites, file downloads, and online map databases. The distribution platform may determine whether large amounts of data may be included in a map, which may be feasible if the platform supports data filtering, or if multiple map products must be published separately (one per data type). The publisher may choose to host the map data on its own server or on a commercial hosting service. When a map is distributed as a downloadable file, a file format must be selected. Raster formats include TIFF, PNG, and JPEG. Common vector formats include SVG and PDF, while geospatial vector data may be distributed in formats such as Shapefile. (Note: Transparency may be required for some map designs and, if so, selecting a format that supports transparency is important.) Prior to publication, copyright and licensing policies should be established and documented. Legal disclaimers related to potential errors in cartographic data may be needed if liability is a concern.

== Profession and regulation ==
Cartographers have established several professional associations that advance and disseminate map-related knowledge through conferences and journals. A leading group is the International Cartographic Association, which publishes the International Journal of Cartography and The Cartographic Journal. Other organizations include the International Society for Photogrammetry and Remote Sensing, International Geographical Union, National Geographic Society, and Royal Geographical Society. The Canadian Cartographic Association publishes Cartographica: The International Journal for Geographic Information and Geovisualization.

In addition to these organizations, most nations maintain government agencies responsible for producing maps, such as Geoscience Australia and Japan's Geospatial Information Authority. Production standards for navigational charts are coordinated by the International Hydrographic Organization (nautical charts) and the International Civil Aviation Organization (aeronautical charts).

== Society and culture ==
=== Bias and disinformation ===
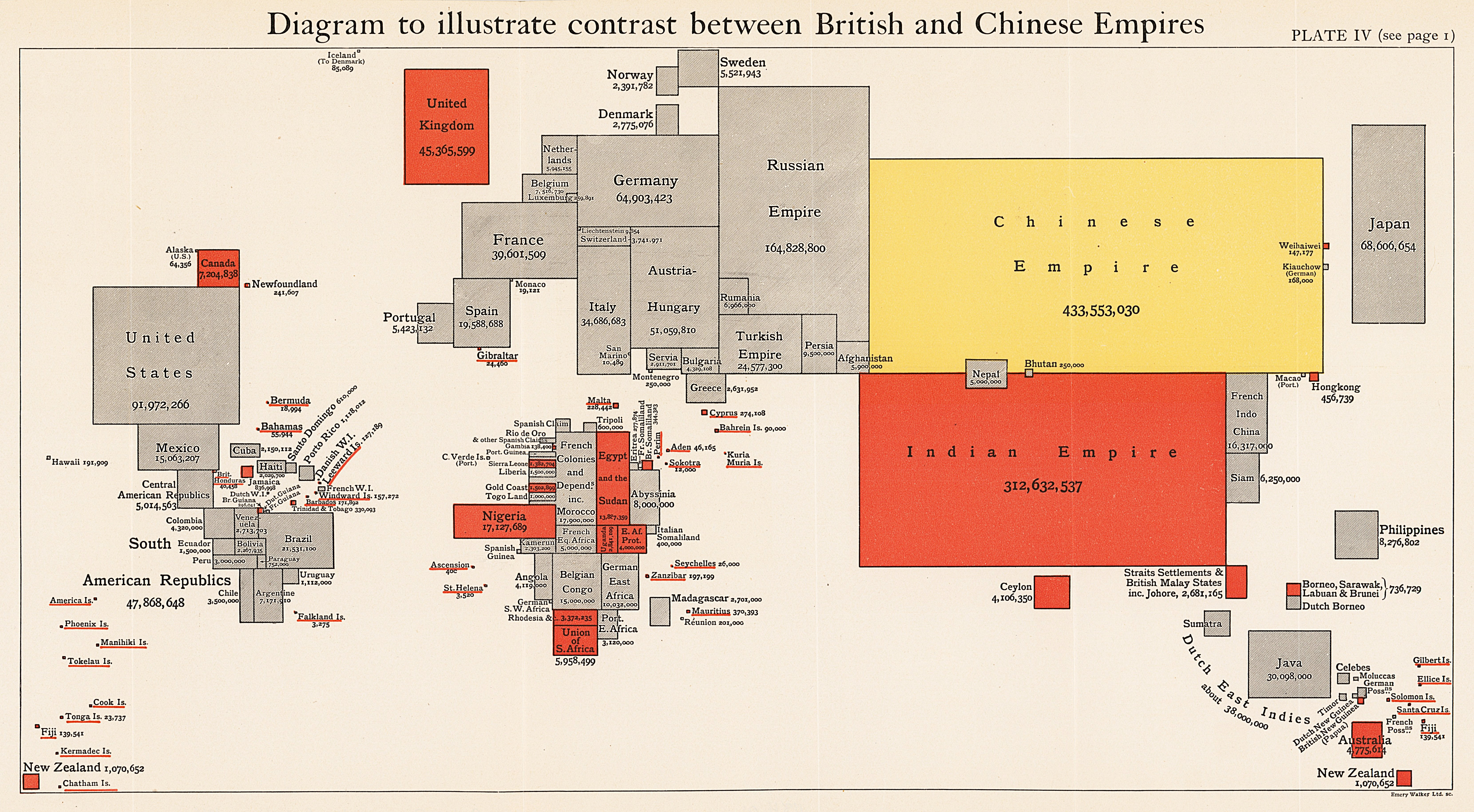
This cartogram was published in 1916 to emphasize the size and extent of the British Empire. The area of each country is proportional to its population.

The Mercator projection greatly distorts the size of certain countries.

All maps are selective representations of geographic reality and therefore involve some degree of inaccuracy, distortion, or omission. Some of these departures from geographic reality are intentional; others are inherent consequences of simplifying and symbolizing geographic information. Situations in which mapmakers deliberately mislead the audience include advertising, military disinformation campaigns, political propaganda, and applications for controversial urban development projects. An example of deliberately inserted misinformation is a copyright trap, which is a fictional object or place inserted unobtrusively into a map by the mapmaker to detect unauthorized copies. The geographers J.B. Harley and Mark Monmonier argue that all maps should be treated with skepticism because they reflect editorial and content choices made by their creators.

Some map projections can significantly misrepresent the relative sizes of countries, particularly on world maps. In the 1970s, the historian Arno Peters asserted that the widespread use of the Mercator projection was "cartographic imperialism", as it shows European countries relatively enlarged compared to developing countries – especially in Africa – nearer to the equator. Peters presented the Gall-Peters projection – an equal-area projection – as an alternative that he regarded as more equitable. (Note: Peters' favored projection, the Gall-Peters projection, is not considered useful by some cartographers, as it depicts Africa (and other regions) as too narrow. Peters' campaign to move away from the Mercator projection was partly successful, and organizations such as the United Nations began using alternative projections. Another proposed alternative to the Mercator projection is the Equal Earth projection.)

Another source of potential Eurocentric bias is the north-up orientation used by most maps, which Guyanese politician Shridath Ramphal argued could contribute to an implicit perception of northern countries as superior. Australian Stuart McArthur created a south-up world map in 1979 that placed his country in a position of prominence. It was titled "McArthur's Universal Corrective Map of the World".

=== Boundary disputes ===
Maps play a role in boundary disputes between nations; for example, countries use maps during negotiations as tools to support their claims. Concerns about the location of boundary lines displayed in online maps, such as Google Maps, have led involved countries to instruct data providers to display a particular boundary line. Google Maps has responded to such demands by storing two versions of the disputed boundary and choosing the version to display based on the requester's location. Examples of boundary disputes that have led nations to instruct map providers to display a particular boundary line include: Russia and Ukraine, India and China, Pakistan and India, Turkey and the cultural region of Kurdistan, Cambodia and Thailand, and Vietnam and China's maritime boundary dispute in the South China Sea.

=== Gerrymandering ===
A simple illustration of gerrymandering

Maps can be used to skew election results by establishing voting district boundaries in a way that favors a particular outcome. Generally, the political group in power creates electoral maps designed to keep itself in power by diminishing the representation of other groups. This process is called gerrymandering. Gerrymandering is an example of the broader modifiable areal unit problem, whereby changes to the boundaries of geographic regions can alter statistical outcomes. The creation of software applications – in conjunction with geographic databases that indicate how individuals are likely to vote – has automated the process of gerrymandering and enabled even minority groups to define boundary lines that provide them with majority representation in legislative bodies.

=== Fantasy maps ===
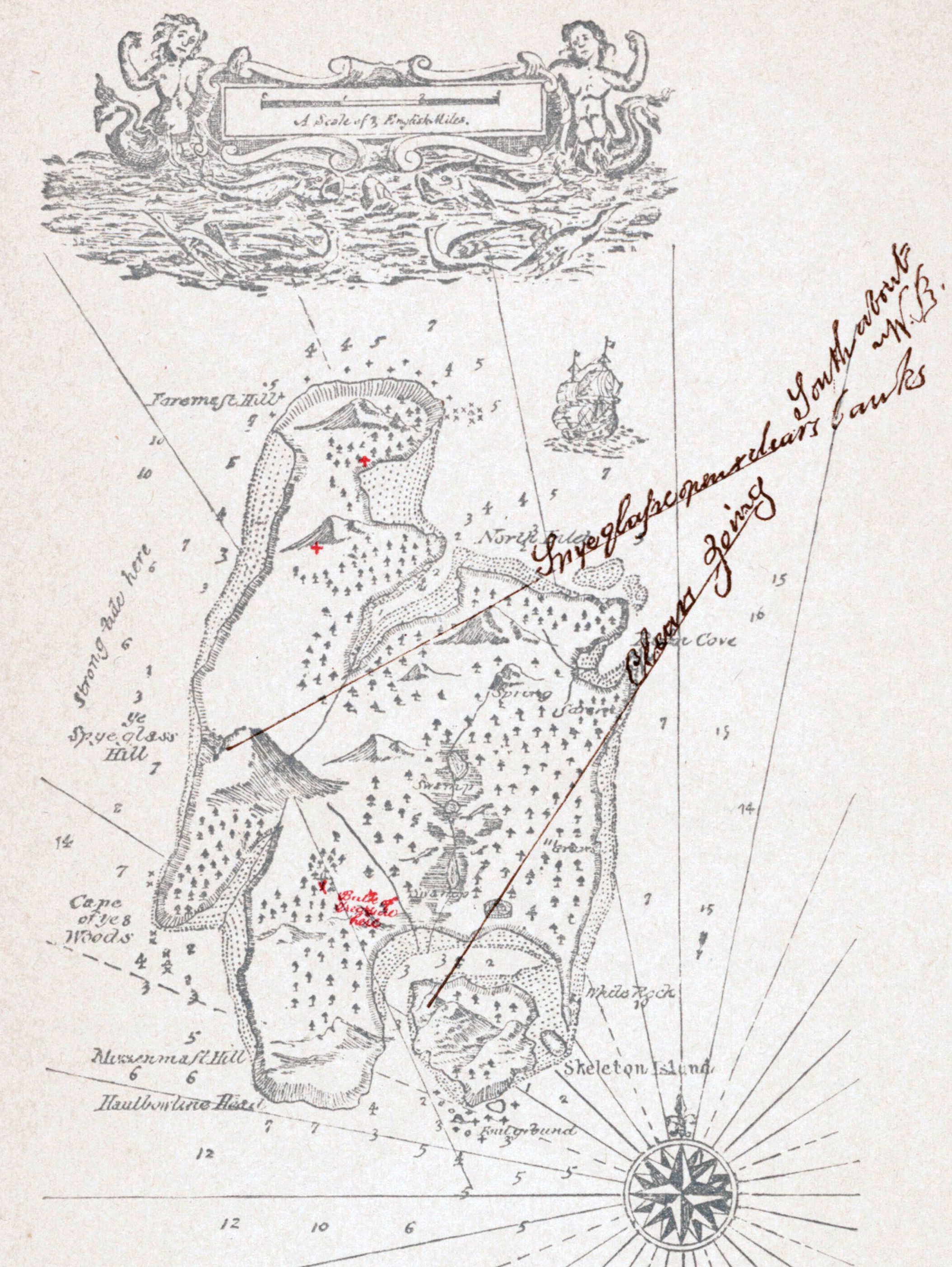
A fantasy map (Note: This is a detail from an illustration drawn by Robert Louis Stevenson for the 1883 edition of his novel Treasure Island.)

Some maps depict imaginary regions or worlds. Examples include maps of Treasure Island in the 1883 novel by Robert Louis Stevenson, the Land of Oz in the Wizard of Oz book series (1900 to 1920) by L. Frank Baum, and Middle-earth in The Lord of the Rings (1937 to 1949) by J. R. R. Tolkien. A 2013 survey of 200 books in the fantasy genre found that 34% contained a map.

=== Orienteering ===
Orienteering is a group of sports in which participants use a map and compass to navigate from point to point in unfamiliar terrain as quickly as possible. In formal foot-orienteering competitions, participants are given a specially prepared orienteering map, usually topographic, which they use to locate control points.
