= Typography (cartography) =

Text used to label maps

An example of a cartographic style guide for a particular institution, including typography standards.

Typography, as an aspect of cartographic design, is the craft of designing and placing text on a map in support of the map symbols, together representing geographic features and their properties. It is also often called map labeling or lettering, but typography is more in line with the general usage of typography. Throughout the history of maps to the present, their labeling has been dependent on the general techniques and technologies of typography.

== History ==
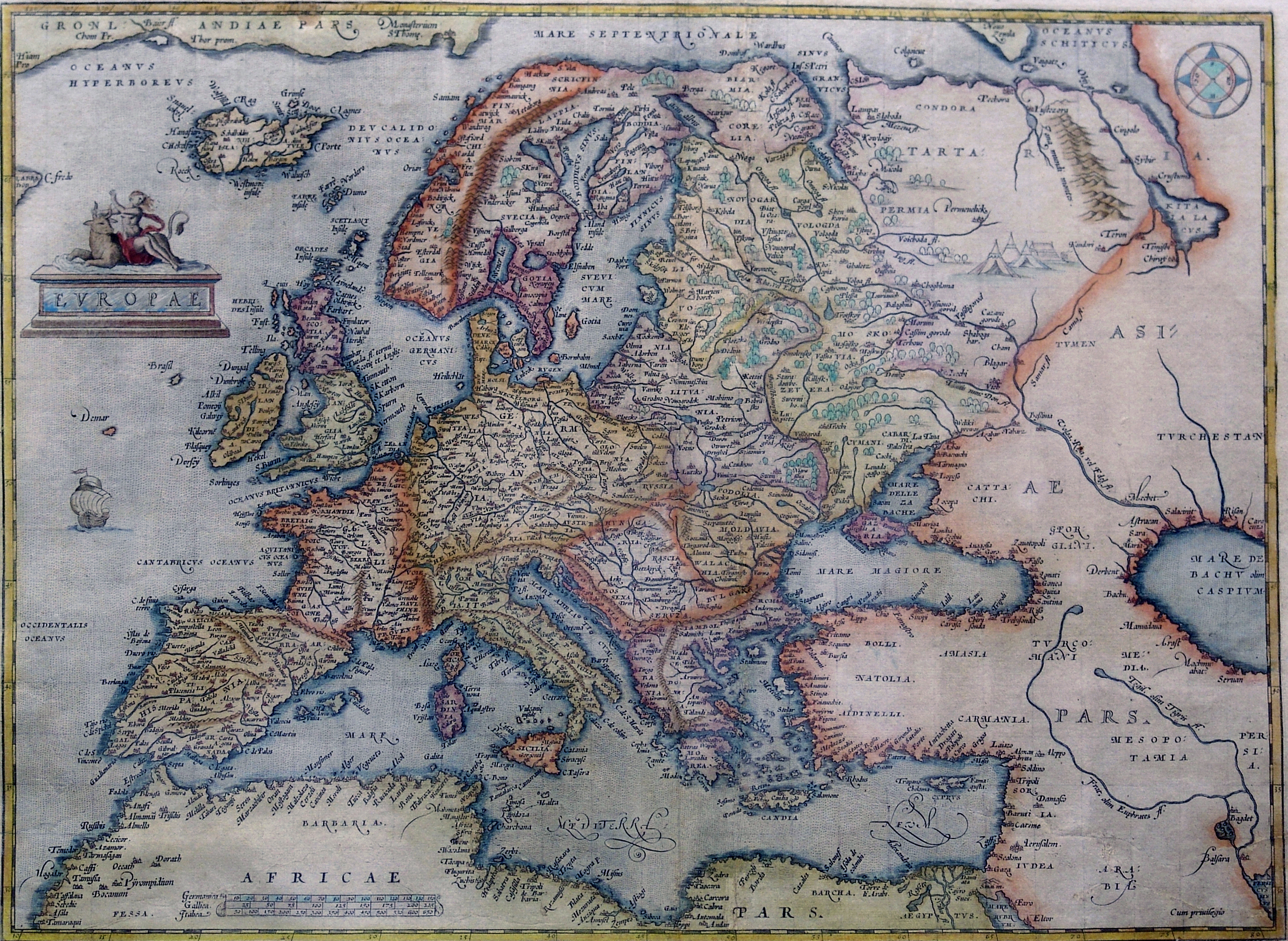
Abraham Ortelius map of Europe, about 1600, produced (including text) by copper engraving.

For most of the history of Cartography, the text on maps was hand drawn, and Calligraphy was an essential part of the skill set of the cartographer. This did not change with the advent of printing in the 15th Century, because the dispersed placement of the text did not lend itself to the use of Movable type. Instead, printed maps, including text, were drawn, engraved, and printed using the Intaglio or "copperplate" process. It was typical for the cartographer to not label the map himself, but to leave it to the master engraver. Text styles frequently changed with the tastes of the time, but were often very ornate, especially in non-map elements such as the title.

The development of Photoengraving, Zincography, and wax engraving in the mid-19th Century significantly changed the production of maps and their labels, enabling the addition of printed type to maps using stamps, but map lettering still required a great deal of skill; this remained the state of the art until the development of Photolithography in the 1950s. The photographic platemaking process meant that type could be produced on paper in a variety of ways, producing map labels of the same quality as book text. That said, as late as 1960, Arthur H. Robinson still advised new cartographers to be skilled in freehand lettering, and mechanical lettering tools were still in common usage through the 1980s, encouraging a very simplistic functional style over any aesthetic character.

A significant turning point was "Die Anordnung der Namen in der Karte", a 1962 essay (re-published in English in 1975) by Swiss cartographer Eduard Imhof, considered the greatest European cartographer of his day. Imhof analyzed the best maps he could find, such as the Swisstopo topographic maps, deriving a set of general principles and guidelines for type design and placement, which subsequent research has largely corroborated and further developed, and which forms the core canon on the topic found in modern cartography textbooks. In 1972, Pinhas Yoeli began to codify Imhof's guidelines mathematically, setting the stage for Automatic label placement. In 2000, Clifford Wood extended Imhof's guidelines, based on the intervening 25 years of research and practice.

The rise of Desktop publishing around 1990, including graphics software, laser printers, and inkjet printers, combined with the improving design capabilities of Geographic information systems, greatly increased and facilitated the more thoughtful design and use of type on maps. A wealth of typefaces became available, and it became easy to place text anywhere on the map. This completed the shift of skill in map typography from construction to design.

== Purposes and goals of map labels ==
In this map of Bryce Canyon National Park, Utah, most of the text identifies features, but there is also text that proscribes ("No Trailers"), describes ("private property"), categorizes ("... Canyon"), and locates ("Paunsaugunt Plateau"). The typeface subtly characterizes the map, being consistently used on all maps and publications of the U.S. National Park Service.

Text simultaneously serves several purposes on maps. In 1993, D. J. Fairbairn introduced a taxonomy of the purposes of text on maps, identifying fourteen types of text role. Since then, others, such as cartography textbooks, have described the variety of roles of text, with the following generally being the most common:

- Identifying unique features, such as "The United Kingdom"
- Categorizing features into groups, such as "Smith Park"
- Describing or explaining information that cannot be directly derived from the map symbols or corroborating the symbolized information, such as "Box Lake (dry)," a note on the history of a building, or varying the size of city labels according to population to the size of the city symbols.
- Locating features that are not shown by a distinct symbol, such as "Arabian Sea" or "Rocky Mountains."
- Prescribing or Proscribing action, such as "No Camping."
- Organizing the conceptual structure of the map as a whole, such as strengthening the visual hierarchy.
- Beautifying the map as a whole.
- Characterizing the map with a particular aesthetic feel, such as using a typeface that looks playful, modern, or historical.

=== Aims and goals of cartographic typography ===
In 1929, Ordnance Survey cartographer Captain John G. Withycombe, in a critique of the state of map lettering, listed five essential aims of cartographic typography.

- Legibility: readers must be able to read the text, especially, as Withycombe states, "when superimposed upon the detail of a map."
- Reproducibility: this may not be as problematic as in 1929, but even modern technologies (especially computer screens) can have difficulty with the relatively small sizes of map labels, especially in colors other than solid black.
- Style: Withycombe points out that careful choice of "alphabet" (typeface) contributes not only to aesthetic appeal, but also to the two aims above.
- Contrast: labels for different kinds of features should themselves look different.
- Harmony: the various typefaces and styles used should work and look good together, and should produce an overall look of order and professionalism.

In his 1962 paper, Imhof reiterated the primary importance of legibility, and added the following requirements (listed here with modern terminology); he then showed how most specific guidelines and practices are derived from these principles:

- Association: the reader must be able to clearly connect each label to the feature it is labeling. Withycombe's contrast is an important part of this.
- Conflict avoidance: many of the above aims can be aided by placing labels so they do not overlap too many map features, especially other labels.
- Extent: labels should help to indicate the spatial extent of the features they label, as well as their distinction from other features
- Hierarchy: like the symbols for each feature, Withycombe's contrast in lettering can be used to strengthen the Visual hierarchy of features in the map.
- Distribution: "Names should not be evenly dispersed over the map, nor should names be densely clustered."

In subsequent literature, textbooks, and the GIS&T Body of Knowledge, legibility, association, and hierarchy are typically listed as the most crucial of these aims, while conflict avoidance is one of the core foundations of Automatic label placement.

== Type styling ==
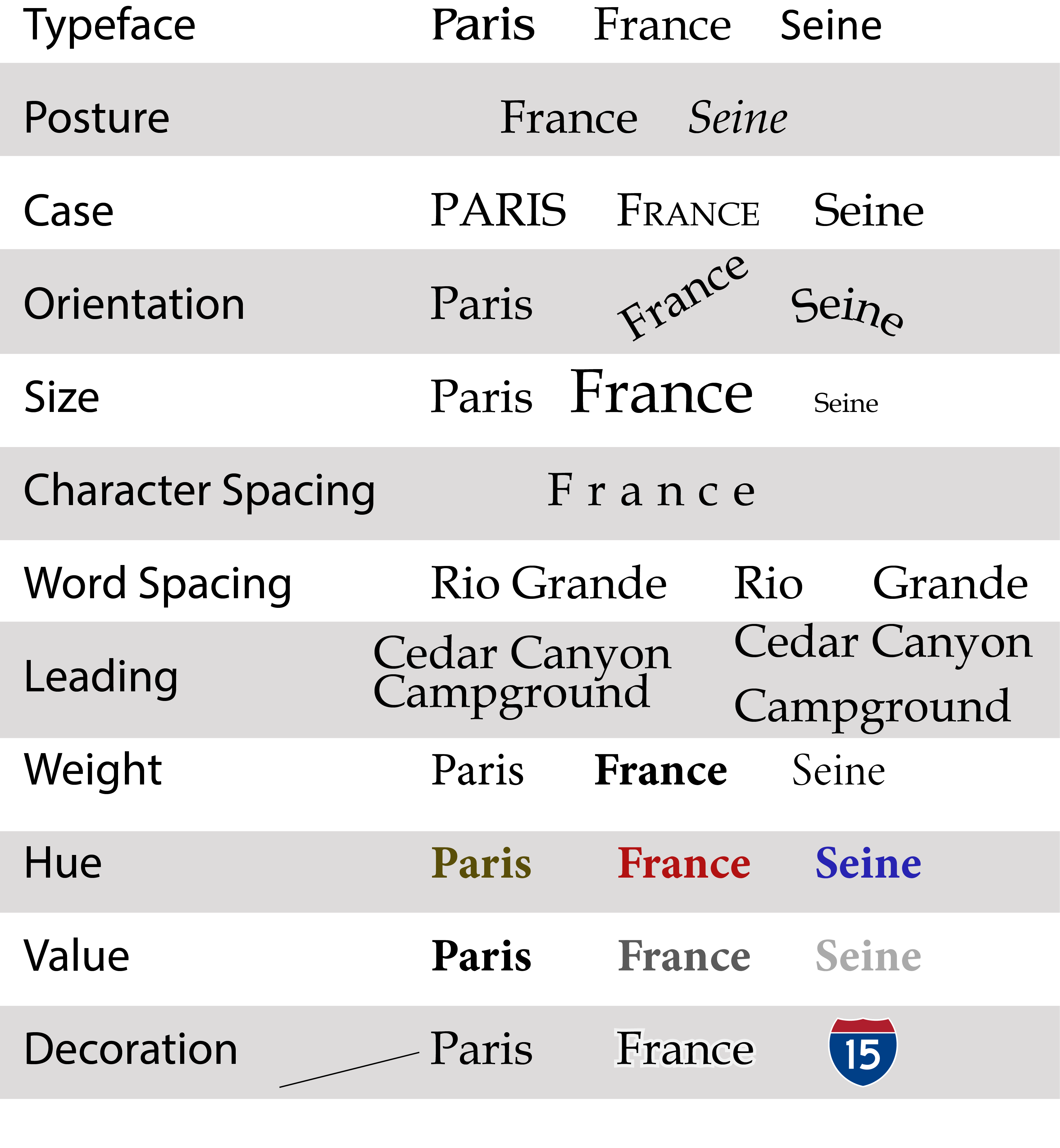
Typographic style variables commonly used in maps

Many of the aspects of type styling can be chosen and controlled by the cartographer when designing a particular label to serve the above purposes. In this sense, they are akin to the visual variables of map symbology; in fact, Jacques Bertin extended his own visual variable system to including type styling in 1980 (in French). This work has largely been ignored in English-speaking countries, although similar ideas have been developed by others. The most commonly cited and used typographic variables include:

- Form is akin to shape in the original visual variables, and serves much the same purpose, to differentiate nominal variables, most often to distinguish different classes of features (city vs. river vs. mountain vs. country). In addition to the following, Bertin also includes other shape variations, such as width (condensed, compressed, extended, etc.) and texture or patterned fills, which are used less often in maps due to their effect on legibility.
  - Typeface ("type shape variation" in Bertin 1980), in addition to its common use to differentiate feature type, has a major influence on the aesthetics of the map.
  - Posture (which Bertin likens to orientation), whether roman, italic, or oblique, is typically used like typeface to differentiate feature types. Wood mentions the common use of italics for labeling hydrographic features, due to its curving form that suggests water flow.
  - Case ("sign shape variation" in Bertin 1980) has a more ordinal sense than typeface or posture, and many cartographers use ALL CAPS to indicate larger features or special types such as national capitals. Its role in visual hierarchy is debatable: at times, upper case seems to stand out because the characters are larger, but at other times it seems to recede because the characters are less interesting than Title Case.
- Orientation, the direction the characters are aligned, is used much more commonly with type than with map symbols. The most common reason to have text not be horizontal is to follow linear features, and sometimes elongated area features (which Imhof calls "ribbon-like").
- Size (usually measured by the block height in points) is usually used for a piece of text in a similar fashion as the map symbol it is labeling: to indicate the geographic extent of the feature, to fit into the visual hierarchy, or to represent some quantitative variable.
- Spacing between characters (tracking), words, and lines (leading) is often varied on maps for a variety of purposes. For example, Imhof suggests using character spacing to spread an area label over the entire area feature, but counsels against doing the same for line labels.
- Weight, whether bold, black, light, or something in between, was considered by Bertin as a value-like variable, suggesting that it has an ordinal representation and a strong influence on visual hierarchy.
- Hue, one of Bertin's original visual variables, is rarely used in type to carry information on its own, although there are exceptions, such as using red (with its connotation of danger) for warnings. Instead, hue is usually used to match the text to the hue of the symbol it is labeling, strengthening its association.
- Value, also one the core visual variables, is typically used to match the value of associated symbols, although often darker, because lighter text can be less legible and have reproducibility problems, especially when printed. It is also commonly used for emphasis in the visual hierarchy.
- Decoration, additional symbols attached to the text, is used differently on maps than in block text. Common decorations such as underline and strikeout are rarely used, but a halo or mask, hiding the underlying features around a label, is often used to increase legibility where there are many features that cannot be avoided. A callout box or leader line are forms of decoration that are added to aid feature association when a label cannot be placed adjacent to the feature. Another form of decoration are highway shields, symbols attached to route numbers, usually to make them look like the signs seen along the highway.

== Placement ==
Determining the ideal location for each label that needs to be on the map is a complex process, with hundreds or thousands of labels competing for space, in addition to the map symbols which are usually more important. It is not a purely subjective decision process; for each label, some locations meet the aims above (especially legibility and association) better than others. An understanding of what makes some placement better than others thus streamlines the process of creating an effective map.

Early textbooks provided some general advice, but the primary contribution of Imhof's 1962 (English 1975) paper was to analyze the best practices of cartographers, and set forth a clear set of rules for label placement. Since then, there has been surprisingly little research into the validity of these rules, especially compared to the numerous psychophysical studies examining many other parts of the map. Even Wood's 2000 update of Imhof, which adds many more guidelines, seems to still be based largely on best practices rather than science. That said, the durability of many of them, in the face of sweeping changes in technology and the capabilities of textual design, and their continued use in professional practice, points to their strength. After decades, only a few of Imhof's original rules have fallen out of favor.

Between Imhof, Wood, and other sources (especially textbooks), it is possible to list dozens of label placement rules. However, dutiful reliance on such lists can be misleading. According to Wood,

The suggestions or 'rules' that follow are intended as guidelines to the intelligent positioning of type, not as inviolate laws to be followed blindly. In the practical application of these principles, it will seldom be possible to satisfy all the rules applying to a given situation. The cartographer must apply the total 'sense' of the guidelines, accepting some and rejecting others.

The "sense of the guidelines" Wood mentions are the aims of legibility, feature association, and a harmonious aesthetic of the map as ordered, professional, and clear. Almost all suggested guidelines can be deduced by evaluating possible labels according to those aims.

From the various lists of placement guidelines, the following is a sample of those most commonly emphasized:

=== General guidelines ===
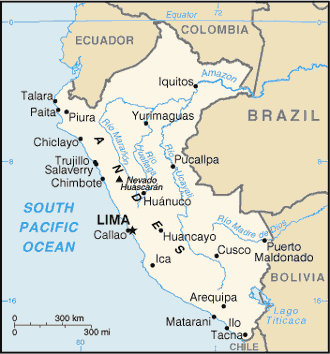
CIA Map of Peru, generally following standard guidelines for point, line, and area labels. Several exceptions were made to those guidelines when the situation necessitated such.

- To aid association, labels should be placed as close to the associated map symbol as possible, without touching it (which would reduce legibility and recognition of the symbol).
- In terms of orientation, horizontal text is easiest to read, and upside-down text is most difficult. When north varies from the vertical direction (such as a tilted map orientation or a projection that distorts direction), following the graticule so that "horizontal"=East-West helps to strengthen the understanding of direction and appears better aligned. Angled text appears more graceful and professional when placed along a slight circular arc rather than straight (unless it is following an angled straight linear feature).
- Spacing (character, word, or line) can aid the association of the label with long or large features, such as spreading a label to fill a country, but this comes at the expense of legibility. Most sources suggest that spacing be used sparingly, carefully, and evenly.
- Overprinting: when labels cross map symbols (especially those that are of high visual weight), they will be less legible, and obscure the shape and reduce the figure-ground contrast of the underlying feature. Usually, careful positioning of labels into empty space can avoid these conflicts, but when they cannot, masking or halos can be used to hide the underlying feature, as long as they do not obstruct so much of it as to make it unrecognizable or attract attention to themselves (usually avoided by making the mask the background color rather than white). Moving the label with an attached leader line can also mitigate conflicts, although it reduces association slightly. Map symbols that are low in the visual hierarchy can often be overprinted without difficulty.

=== Point features ===
This also includes area features that are too small to label inside, in which case an exterior label treats the area symbol as a point symbol.

- In terms of the directional relationship between the point and the label, some positions have better association and legibility than others. Most follow the preferences of Yoeli, who based it on Imhof. The label to the upper right of the point is generally accepted as preferred, with the other corners acceptable. Directly to the left or to the right is problematic because the point and the label can run together, and centering the label above or below the point, which was acceptable to Imhof, is now generally discouraged because it can lead to association issues.
- When the point symbol is next to a line or area, especially one with a visually strong symbol (such as a city along a river or the sea), association is strengthened by placing the label on the same side as the point. This is frequently violated along shorelines because the water side generally has far fewer features and labels to contend with, so placing labels in the "empty space" aids legibility.
- Spacing is generally discouraged, especially on point labels broken into multiple lines. Being "set tight" helps the label look like a single object.

=== Line features ===
Often, these guidelines are also followed for area features with a very linear shape, such as wide rivers.

- Labels should generally follow the direction and curvature of the line feature. Text is legible on very simple, smooth curves, but is greatly reduced when text bends around sharp corners, so it is best placed in a relatively straight segment of the line, or along a smoothed version of the line.
- It is slightly preferable to place the label above the line rather than below. The most commonly stated reason is that most western languages have more ascenders than descenders, so the baseline is more of a straight line to follow the shape of the feature.
- Association will be strongest if the label is placed near the midpoint of the line (or evenly spaced along the line if there are multiple copies of the label).
- Character spacing is almost universally discouraged, but some cartographers find word spacing acceptable as long as the words can be easily connected by the reader.
- For a long line, especially in a dense network (such as rivers and roads), labels can be repeated occasionally to avoid confusion and aid association. Too much repetition can be overwhelming.

=== Area (polygon) features ===
These guidelines also apply to clusters of points or small areas being labeled as a single feature, such as an island chain.

- All else being equal, a label location near the center of the feature will maximize association.
- Many, but not all, sources suggest using letter and line spacing (within reason to not damage legibility) to fill more (but not all) of the area will aid association.
- Some cartographers prefer All caps for area symbols, claiming that capital letters fill more space.
- Placing the label completely inside the area is preferable, although it can be placed completely outside if the area is very small. Having a label cross the area boundary reduced its figure-ground contrast and its feature association, although if absolutely necessary, aligning the label so that it starts inside and crosses the boundary once to the outside is preferable to a centered label that crosses the boundary on both sides.
- For areas with an extended shape (which Imhof calls "ribbon-like"), such as reservoirs, their labels will have stronger association if they are oriented (with a slight curve) along the main axis of the shape.

== Digital text management ==
The software that is commonly used to create maps, including both geographic information systems and graphic design programs, provide a number of options for creating, editing, and storing the hundreds or even thousands of labels in a map. Each of these has advantages and disadvantages for particular situations.

=== Automatic label placement ===
Manually placing a large number of labels is a very time-consuming process, even in modern software; this is especially problematic in Web mapping, where millions of maps are generated every day with no direct input from a cartographer on label placement. Starting in the 1970s, the need for automation was recognized. Yoeli (1972) recognized that many of the placement guidelines espoused by Imhof (1962) and others had an algorithmic or mathematical character to them, which he attempted to specify in preparation for future placement algorithms.

Since then, increasingly robust algorithms have been developed, and existing computational algorithms (such as Simulated annealing) have been adapted to the labeling problem. Today, automated label placement tools are widespread, and is found in software as varied as GI, batch map renderers such as Mapnik, and javascript mapping libraries. That said, because map labelling involves subjective judgments as well as rules or guidelines, most algorithms produce rules that are sub-optimal, especially in complex maps. When possible, cartographers generally use automated labels as a starting point, then refine them.

=== Stored annotation ===
The other option is to store the location and style of each label in the map data, just like the rest of the map; this is typically called annotation. Text can be modeled as a Geometric primitive, like points, lines, and polygons, and in graphics software, it is stored in the map document in the same way as other geometry, allowing for manual editing of content, position, and style. Many GIS platforms also have this option, but some have the additional option of storing text as a dataset, enabling the same annotation to be reused in multiple maps.

== See also ==
- Toponymy
- Typography
- Cartographic design
