= Map coloring =

Use of color to differentiate map features

Topographic map of Easter Island using colors to show elevations.

In cartographic design, map coloring is the act of choosing colors as a form of map symbol to be used on a map.

Color is a very useful attribute to depict different features on a map. Typical uses of color include displaying different political divisions, different elevations, or different kinds of roads. A choropleth map is a thematic map in which areas are colored differently to show the measurement of a statistical variable being displayed on the map. The choropleth map provides an easy way to visualize how a measurement varies across a geographic area or it shows the level of variability within a region. In addition to choropleth maps, a cartographer should strive to depict colors effectively on any kind of map.

Displaying the data in different hues can greatly affect the understanding or feel of the map. In many cultures, certain colors have connotations. These connotations lie under a field of study called color symbolism. For example, coloring a certain nation a color that has a negative connotation in their culture could be counterproductive. Likewise, using assumed skin colors to show racial or ethnic patterns will likely cause offense. It is not possible to always predict the color connotations of every map reader or to avoid negative connotations, but it is helpful to be aware of common color connotations in order to make a map as appealing and understandable as possible.

Cartographers may also choose to pick hues that are associated with what they are mapping. For example, when mapping precipitation, they may choose to use shades of blue or for a map of wildfires they may use yellows, reds, and oranges. Carefully choosing colors ensures that the map is intuitive and easy to read. This process is referred to as feature association. Also, the cartographer must take into account that many people have impaired color vision, and colors must be used that are easily distinguishable by such readers.

The 2004 United States presidential election visualised using an eight-colored choropleth map

A general rule is that most people can differentiate only between 5-8 different shades of one color. Rather than more than 8 shades of a color, it is best to use multiple colors. Most GIS programs provide users with carefully curated color schemes to choose from, thus making the process of selecting colors easier.

Colors can also be used to produce three-dimensional effects from two-dimensional maps, either by explicit color-coding of the two images intended for different eyes, or by using the characteristics of the human visual system to make the map look three-dimensional.

== See also ==
- ColorBrewer
