= Statistical map =

A statistical map may refer to:

- Cartogram
- Choropleth map
- Bivariate map

== See also ==
- Thematic map
