= Sankey diagram =

Specific type of graphic flow diagram

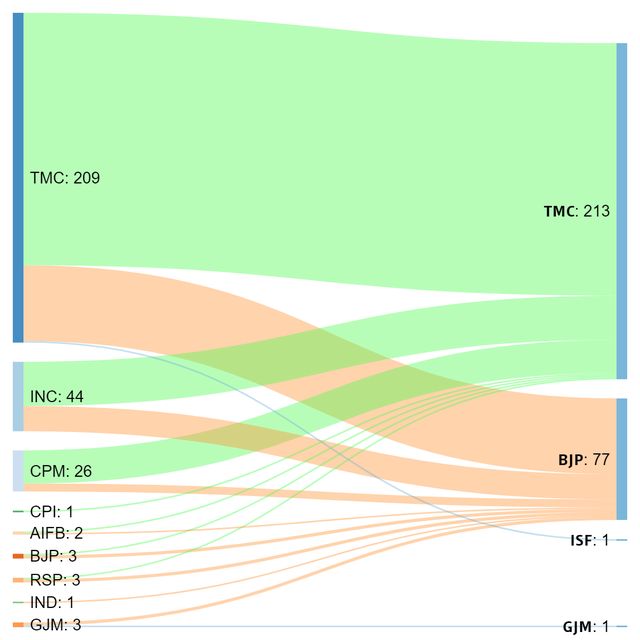
A Sankey diagram of seats held by parties before and after the 2021 West Bengal Legislative Assembly election

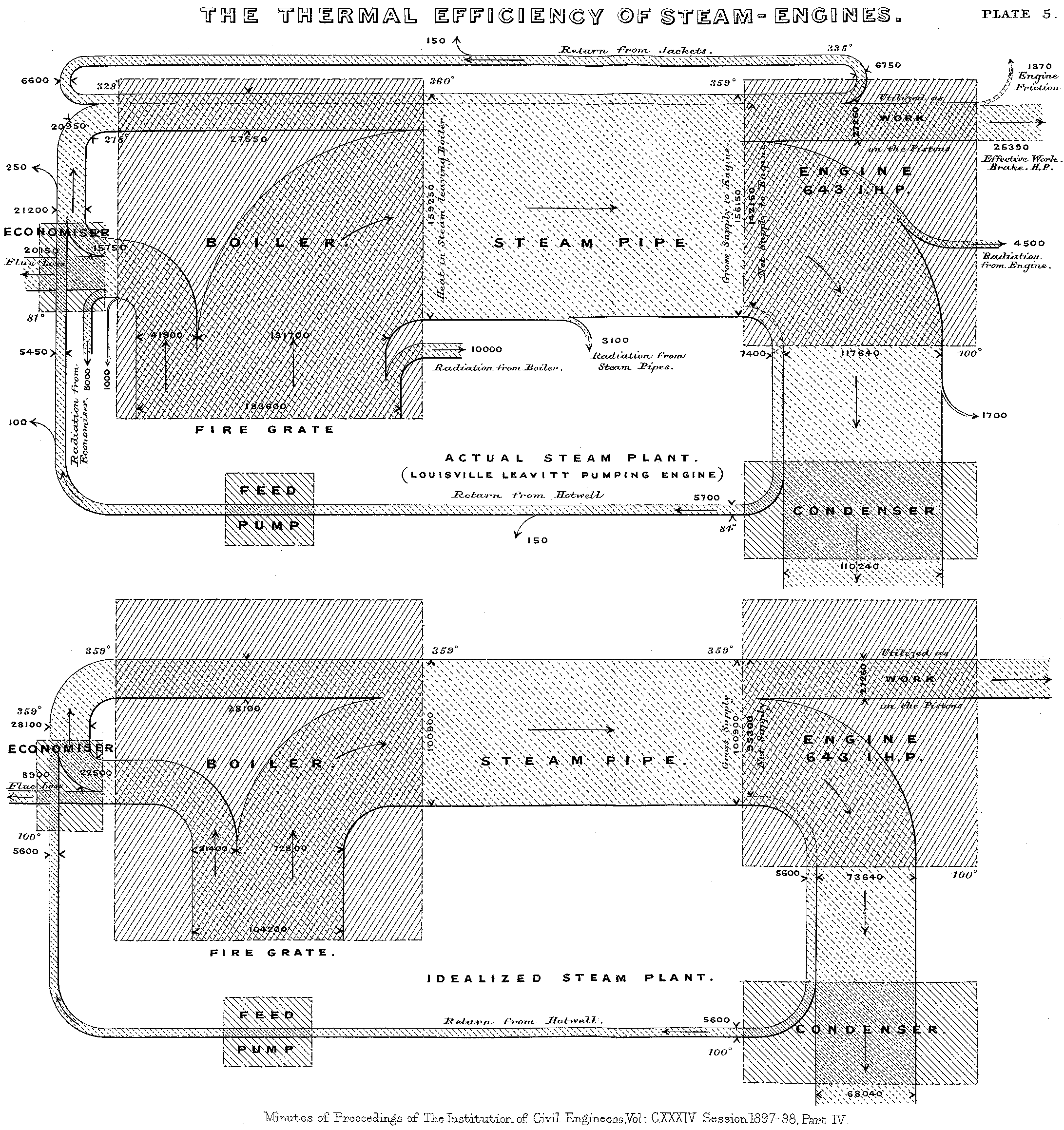
Sankey's original 1898 diagram showing the energy efficiency of a steam engine

Sankey diagrams are a data visualisation technique or flow diagram that emphasizes flow/movement/change from one state to another or one time to another, in which the width of the arrows is proportional to the flow rate of the depicted extensive property. The arrows being connected are called nodes and the connections are called links.

Sankey diagrams can also visualize the energy accounts, material flow accounts on a regional or national level, and cost breakdowns. The diagrams are often used in the visualisation of material flow analysis.

Sankey diagrams emphasize the major transfers or flows within a system. They help locate the most important contributions to a flow. They often show conserved quantities within defined system boundaries.

== History and name ==
Sankey diagrams are named after Irish Captain Matthew Henry Phineas Riall Sankey, who used this type of diagram in 1898 in a classic figure (see diagram) showing the energy efficiency of a steam engine. The original charts in black and white displayed just one type of flow (e.g., steam); using colors for different types of flows lets the diagram express additional variables.

Over time, it became a standard model used in science and engineering to represent heat balance, energy flows, material flows, and since the 1990s this visual model has been used in life-cycle assessment of products.

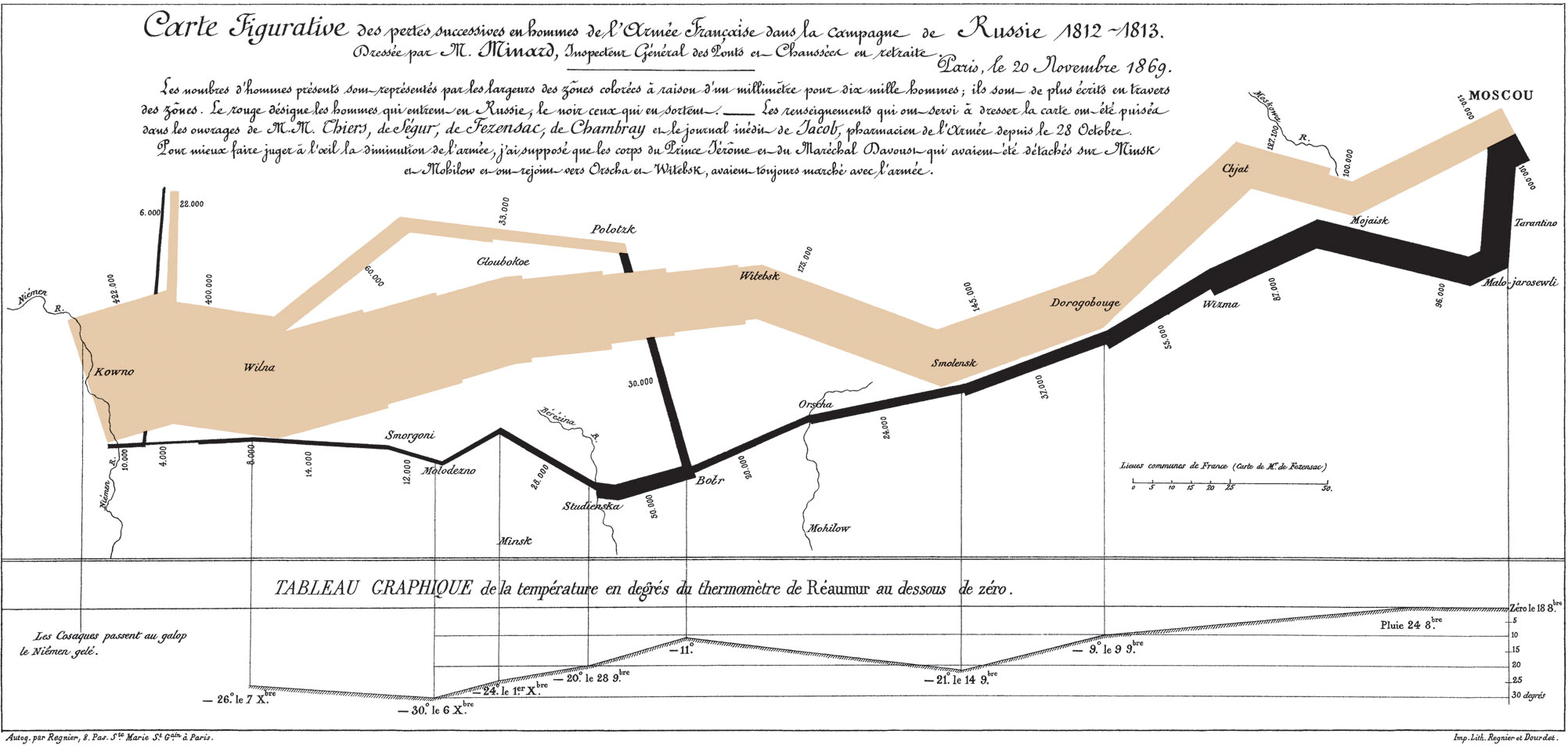
Minard's diagram of Napoleon's invasion of Russia, using the feature now named after Sankey

One of the most famous Sankey diagrams is Charles Minard's Map of Napoleon's Russian Campaign of 1812. It is a flow map, overlaying a Sankey diagram onto a geographical map. It was created in 1869, predating Sankey's diagram of 1898. Minard had used this form of diagram for visualising flow of goods and transport of people from at least since 1844.

== Use in science ==
Earth's energy budget – line thickness is linearly proportional to relative amount of energy

Sankey diagrams are often used in fields of science, especially physics. They are used to represent energy inputs, useful output, and wasted output.

== Examples ==
The US Energy Information Administration (EIA) produces numerous Sankey diagrams annually in its Annual Energy Review which illustrate the production and consumption of various forms of energy.

The US Department of Energy's Lawrence Livermore Laboratory maintains a site of Sankey diagrams, including US energy flow and carbon flow.

Eurostat, the Statistical Office of the European Union, has developed an interactive Sankey web tool to visualise energy data by means of flow diagrams. The tool allows the building and customisation of diagrams by playing with different options (country, year, fuel, level of detail).

The International Energy Agency (IEA) created an interactive Sankey web application that details the flow of energy for the entire planet. Users can select specific countries, points of time back to 1990, and modify the arrangement of various flows within the Sankey diagram.

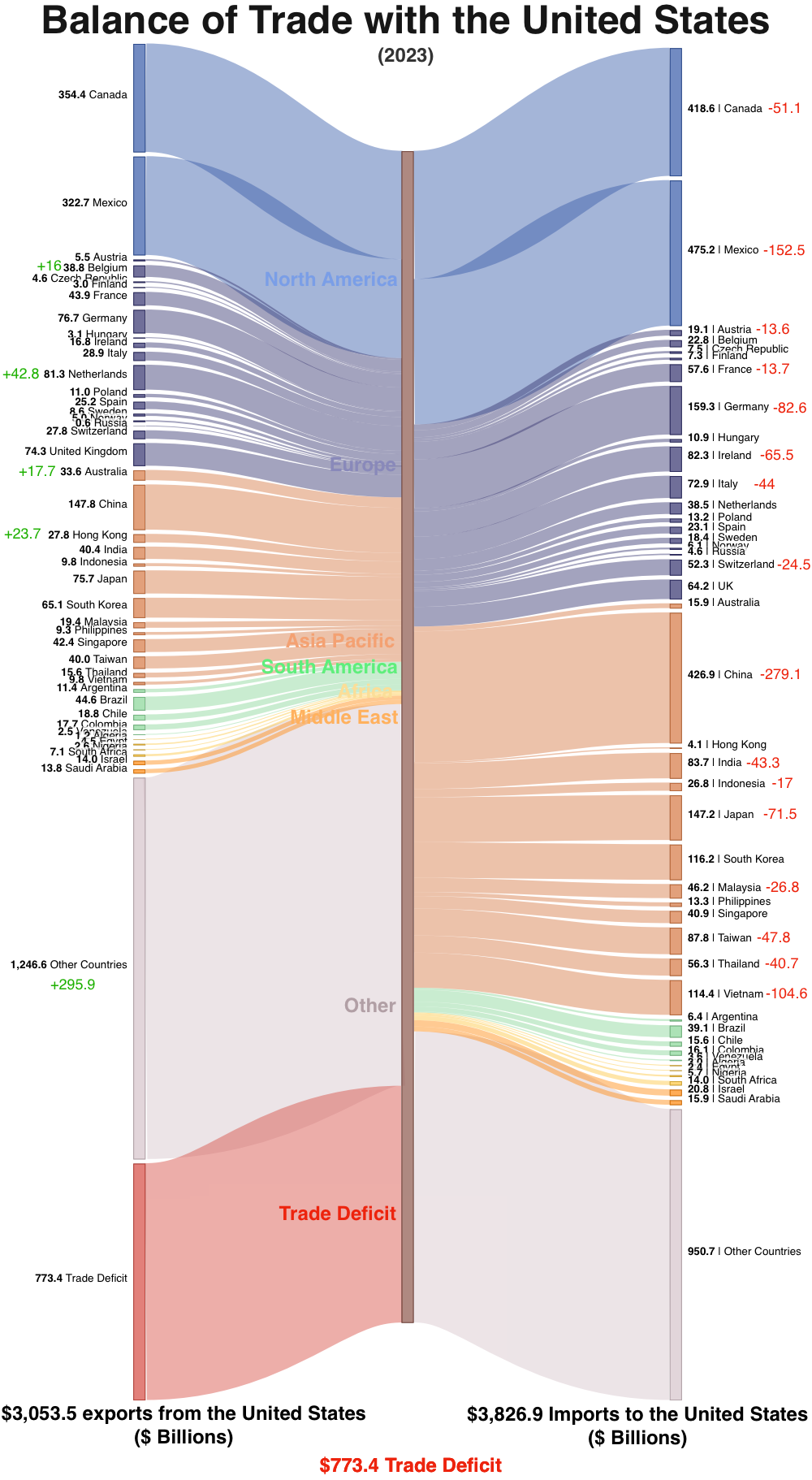
Balance of trade with the United States (2023)

== See also ==
- Alluvial diagram – a type of Sankey diagram that uses the same kind of representation to depict how items re-group
- Material flow management
- Parallel coordinates
- Time geography
