= Ferjan Ormeling Jr. =

Dutch cartographer (1942–2025)

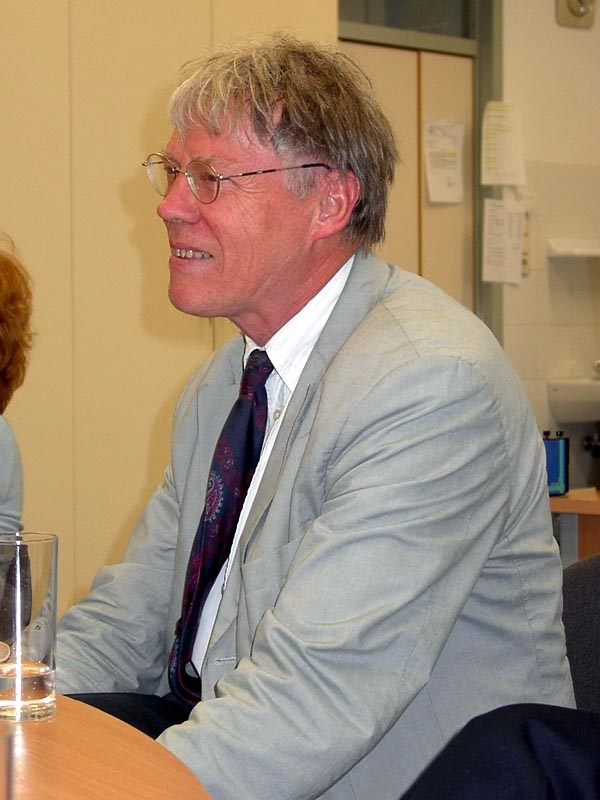

Ferdinand Jan Ormeling Jr. (20 November 1942 – 13 June 2025), mainly known as Ferjan Ormeling, was a Dutch cartographer. He was the son of the well-known cartographer and geographer Ferdinand Jan Ormeling Sr.

== Life and career ==
Born in Utrecht, Ferjan Ormeling lived in The Hague until he was six years old. His parents Ferdinand Jan Ormeling Sr. and K.J. (Ina) ten Hoopen were both geographers. In 1948, the family moved to Java, where his father set up the Geographical Institute of Batavia. In 1961, Ferjan Jr. went to study geography at the University of Groningen. He attended lectures by Willem Frederik Hermans, among others. During his entire study period, Ferjan worked at J.B. Wolters at the Bosatlas, of which his father had meanwhile become editor-in-chief. In 1968, he married, in 1971 and 1973 a son and a daughter were born. After graduating in 1969, he went to work at the Utrecht University under Professor Cornelis Koeman, with whom he had attended secondary courses. On 3 June 1983, he received his doctorate with a thesis on the inclusion of geographical names in minority languages on topographical maps. Promoters were Cornelis Koeman and Dick Blok.

From 1985 to 2009, Prof. Dr. Ormeling was professor of cartography at Utrecht University. He gave lectures on atlas cartography, environmental mapping, cartographic theory, historical cartography, map editing and map production. As the driving force of one of the few cartography courses in the Netherlands, he was the figurehead of cartography in the Netherlands for more than two decades. Among other things, he was concerned with the question of how thematic maps should be designed in order to achieve the best possible transfer of information. He strongly criticized the maps in government reports (and the frequent lack of maps in them). Those bad maps would stand in the way of good decision-making by, for example, the House of Representatives. In his inaugural address entitled Beeldvorming (Conceptualization) in April 1986, Ormeling stated: The description of the map material is a lithany, a succession of cartographic errors, misunderstanding and ignorance. On 13 June 2025, Ormeling died in Utrecht at the age of 82.

== Functions ==
Ormeling was a member of the board of the Nederlandse Vereniging voor Kartografie (Netherlands Cartographic Association) since 1975, as vice-chairman from 1983 and as chairman from 1995 to 1997, after which he left the board. In 2001, he was made an honorary member. He was also always a member of the editorial board of the Kartografisch tijdschrift (Cartographic journal), from 1983 as editor-in-chief.

Ormeling chaired the Foreign Geographical Names working group of the Dutch Language Union, which advises on the spelling of the names concerned in Dutch. He was also chairman of the Advisory Committee on Geographical Names in the Netherlands. This committee provides advice to governments, solicited or unsolicited, about geographical names in the Netherlands, such as water names, place names, field names or names of works of art.

From 1999 to 2007, he was Secretary-General and Treasurer of the International Cartographic Association.

== Awards ==
In 2009, Ormeling was awarded the Gold Carl Mannerfelt Medal, the highest award in cartography, by the International Cartographic Association for his scientific achievements. On 10 May 2013, he received an Honorary degree from Eötvös Loránd University in Budapest. On 7 May 2015, he received an honorary degree from the Aristotle University of Thessaloniki. From 8–16 August 2017, he was the President-elect of the 11th United Nations Conference on the Standardization of Geographical Names in New York City. On 24 June 2022, in Berlin, he received the gold Mercator medal for special services to cartography from the chairman of the Deutsche Gesellschaft fur Kartographie.

== Bibliography ==
- Ferjan Ormeling & Corné P.J.M. van Elzakker. Digital atlas user requirements and user scenarios. ICA, 1993.
- Menno-Jan Kraak & Ferjan Ormeling. Cartography, visualization of spatial data. Harlow, Longman, 1996. ISBN 0-582-25953-3.
- Functionality of electronic school atlases. ICA, 1996.
- Teaching map use concepts to children. ICA Commission on Cartography and Children, 1996.
- Ferjan Ormeling (ed). Second Anglo-Dutch seminar on cartography, held in Enschede, 3–4 April 1997. Amersfoort, Nederlandse Vereniging voor Kartografie, 1998. NVK publikatiereeks, nr. 26.
- Map use education and geovisualisation. Jakarta, FIG, 2004.
- Minority toponyms on maps - vingt ans apres. Dutch and German-speaking Division UNGEGN, 2005.
- Colonial cartography of the Netherlands East Indies 1816-1942. ICA, 2005.

== Literature ==
- Elger Heere, Martijn Storms. Ormeling's cartography, presented to Ferjan Ormeling on the occasion of his 65th birthday and his retirement as professor of cartography. Utrecht, Koninklijk Nederlands Aardrijkskundig Genootschap, 2007. ISBN 978-90-6809-407-7.
