= Ferdinand Jan Ormeling Sr. =

Dutch geographer (1912–2002)

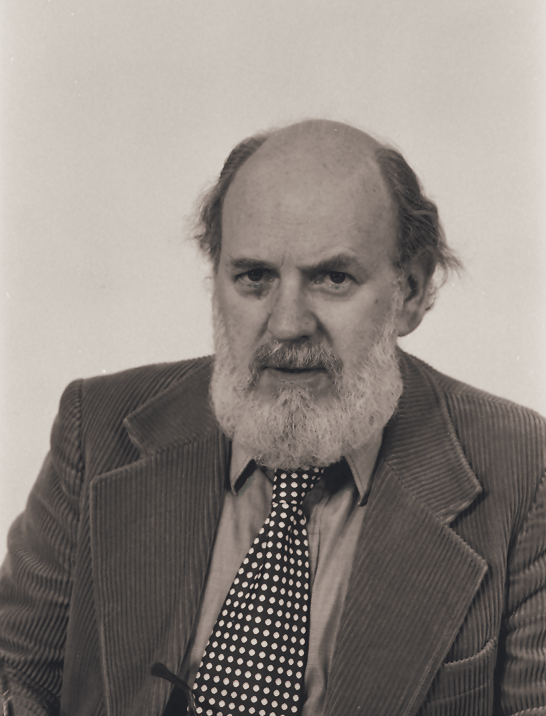
- Born: 12 April 1912; Amsterdam, Netherlands
- Died: 1 May 2002 (aged 90)
- Children: Ferjan Ormeling Jr. (son)

Ferdinand Jan Ormeling Sr. (Amsterdam, 12 April 1912 – Lonneker, 1 May 2002) was a Dutch geographer and cartographer. He achieved national and international recognition for his scientific, didactic and organizational skills.

== Biography ==
After studying human geography under the supervision of Professor Louis van Vuuren at the Utrecht University, Ormeling was a secondary school teacher in Hilversum and The Hague for several years. After World War II he left as a military volunteer to the then Dutch East Indies and served there as an intelligence officer. In 1948 he was transferred to the Geographical Institute of the Topographical Service in Batavia, of which he became the first director. In 1955 he obtained his doctorate from the University of Indonesia in Jakarta with a dissertation on the development of Timor. Back in the Netherlands, he joined the atlas and school book publisher J.B. Wolters in Groningen. He founded the Geo-cartographic Institute within the company; in 22 years he edited nine editions (the 40th in 1959 to the 48th in 1976) of the well-known Grote Bosatlas. He increased the scientific quality and didactic value of the atlas by, among other things, the introduction of hundreds of thematic maps and a clearer map image. He also modernized the Kleine Bosatlas in five editions. He was appointed in 1964 Professor of Economic Geography at the University of Amsterdam and established a Research Institute in the subject. He organized a toponomy training course in Cisarua, Indonesia in 1982 which was the first UNGEGN course on the subject.

== Delft ==
He was appointed a professor of Cartography at the International Institute for Geo-Information Science and Earth Observation (ITC) in Delft in 1971. For the Cartography Department established at the time of his appointment, he managed to bring together a productive team of diverse specialized employees and to set up an education program on four levels (technician, technologist, bachelor and master). It featured themes such as regional planning, cartography and automation. His department soon became the second largest in the ITC. The number of applications for admission from predominantly foreign students was many times greater than the number of places available. Ormeling brought the training of once lesser-known discipline of cartography to the same level as the engineering courses of the ITC. The training of foreign students has led to the introduction or significant improvement in mapping in many parts of the world, which is one of the objectives of the ITC. Ormeling significantly contributed to the ITC which made it one of the first institutions in the Netherlands to enjoy Chinese interest. The Cartography department also joined a partnership that the Cartography department of the University of Utrecht had entered into with the Geodesy department of the Delft University of Technology.

== International ==
In 1967 he was one of the initiators of the UNGEGNs Dutch- and German-speaking Division. At the same time, Ormeling promoted the practical practice of cartography worldwide during his long board membership (23 years) of the International Cartographic Association (ICA). He was first secretary general (1968–1976) vice-president (1964–1976) and then president of the ICA (1976–1984); in these functions, he significantly increased the number of participating countries: from 24 to 59. Some notable ICA workshops on automated cartography that Ormeling organized were in Nairobi (1978), Jakarta (1980) and Wuhan (1981). He was an honorary member of many national cartographic associations. The ICA showed its appreciation for his activities by awarding him in 1987, its highest award, the Mannerfelt Medal. From 1967 to 1971 he was chairman of the Royal Dutch Geographical Society. Previously, for 10 years he was chairman of the Cartographic Section of the society, which he co-founded in 1957.

== Cartographic collections ==
Ormeling was a collector of textbooks, monographs, conference proceedings, etc., in the field of cartography. His collection included many important cartographic publications from all parts of the world. After his death, his family donated the collection to the ITC. The Ormeling collection is managed by the library of the ITC and is supplemented with newer editions. His large atlas collection, together with that of his son Ferjan Ormeling Jr., is housed in the map room of the University Library of Utrecht University.

== Honors ==
- Honorary Membership of the Dutch Cartographic Society
- Membre d’Honneur de la Societé de Géographie de France
- Honorary fellowships of the Australian Institute of Cartographers
- The British Cartographic Society Medal
- Carl Mannerfelt Medal (1987)
- Knight of the Order of the Netherlands Lion by the Queen of the Netherlands

== Bibliography ==
The complete bibliography (199 numbers) of Ferdinand Jan Ormeling Sr. is available on Internet Archive WaybackMachine.

== Literature ==
- M. Wood. Ferdinand Jan Ormeling (1912–2002).
- Naftali Kadmon. In memoriam, Ferdinand Jan Ormeling (1912–2002).
