= Günter Schilder =

Dutch historian

Günter Gerhard Schilder (Vienna, born February 18, 1942), is a Dutch leading historian of cartography and for many years held the world's only chair in the history of cartography at the Utrecht University from 1981 to 2004.

== Biography ==
After gymnasium he studied geography and history. He obtained his doctorate on March 16, 1970 at the University of Vienna with his thesis Der Anteil der Niederländer an der Entdeckung von Australien bis Abel Jansz. Tasman und dessen Niederschlag in der Kartographie (The Dutch Participation in the Discovery of Australia till Abel Jansz. Tasman and its Reflection in Cartography). In 1971 he joined Utrecht University as an assistant to Cornelis Koeman. On March 10, 1981, he was appointed as professor at the Interfaculty of Geography and Prehistory of Utrecht University, where he took early emirate on September 1, 2004.

Günter Schilder can rightly be called the godfather of modern Dutch historical cartography and works closely with colleagues at home and abroad, many of whom were his students. One of Schilder's great achievements was the founding of Explokart, of which he was director from 1981 to 2007, a special unit of Utrecht University that focuses on examining cartographic documents from previous centuries, examining the relationships between exploratory voyages and the people and crafts involved in making the resulting maps. Up till 2002 Explokart published 20 cartobibliographies.

One of his pioneering works was the nine-part facsimile series Monumenta Cartographica Neerlandica. At an early stage the objectives were set as: the disclosure and inventory of map and atlas production in Amsterdam in the late sixteenth and early seventeenth centuries, focusing on the Dutch participation in the early geographical discoveries, and the conservation, restoration and production of facsimiles of those maps to safeguard this material for the future.

== Awards ==
On 21 March 2019, the seventeenth Menno Hertzberger Prize was awarded to prof.em.dr. Günter Schilder for his entire oeuvre, in particular Early Dutch maritime cartography.

== Bibliography ==
A complete overview of all his publications can be found at Publicaties Günter Schilder.

== Literature ==
- Libellus amicorum Günter Schilder. Caert-Thresoor, 11e jrg, 1992, nr. 1. On the occasion of his 50th birthday.
- Paula van Gestel-van het Schip and Peter van der Krogt. Mappae antiquae : liber amicorum Günter Schilder : vriendenboek ter gelegenheid van zijn 65ste verjaardag = essays on the occasion of his 65th birthday ... . 't Goy-Houten, Hes & De Graaf, 2007 ISBN 978-90-6194-479-9. Utrechtse historisch-cartografische studies, ISSN 1568-2072, 6. Summaries.
- Peter Reynders. Gunter Schilder--the Great Man of Maps. On: The Free Library.
