= Johan Quanjer =

Johan Henri Quanjer (23 May 1934 – 13 February 2001) was a Dutch writer, publisher, philosopher, and mystic who spent most of his adult life in London. In 1973 he coined the term "Pneumatocracy" for the principle of the rule of the spirit in government and sought to combine politics with personal spirituality.

He was born in Surabaya on the island of Java, where he reported he experienced a mystical vision as a child of two. His family moved to Epe, Netherlands in 1937. He then suffered near starvation during the German occupation of World War II. As a young man he travelled in Canada and America, where he refined his philosophy, but settled in London in 1957 where he became president of the UFO society and editor of the magazine New Humanity.

In 1994 he stood for the European Parliament in the then London South West Constituency on the platform of the Spirit of Europe. He was the first non-British national ever to be nominated to stand in a UK election. He was a strong believer and promoter of the European Union. His autobiography The Luminous Journey: The Reflection of Pneumatocracy, the Rule of the Soul, in My Extraordinary Life was published in 1996.
