= Alan MacEachren =

American geographer and researcher

Alan M. MacEachren
- Born: 1952 (age 73–74); United States
- Education: Ohio University (B.A., 1974) University of Kansas (M.A., 1976; Ph.D., 1979)
- Known for: Human-centered geographic visualization, Scientific visualization, Information visualization
- Scientific career
- Fields: Geography, Geographic visualization, Information visualization, Statistics
- Workplaces: The Pennsylvania State University

Alan M. MacEachren (born 1952) is an American geographer, Professor Emeritus of Geography and former Founding Director of the GeoVISTA Center, Department of Geography, The Pennsylvania State University. He is known for his cross-disciplinary work in the fields of human-centered geographic visualization, scientific and information visualization, and in statistics.

== Biography ==
Alan MacEachren received a B.A. in geography from Ohio University in 1974, an M.A. and a Ph.D. in geography from the University of Kansas in 1976 and 1979, respectively.

From 1979 to 1983, MacEachren was an Assistant Professor of Geography at the Virginia Polytechnic Institute and State University and the Director of their Department of Geography Cartography Laboratory. From 1980 to 1983, he was the Director of the Department of Geography Spatial Analysis Laboratory, Virginia Polytechnic Institute and State University. In 1983, he joined the faculty of the University of Colorado-Boulder as an Assistant Professor of Geography. In 1985, he joined the faculty of The Pennsylvania State University as an Associate Professor of Geography and the Director of the Deasy GeoGraphics Laboratory. He was promoted to Professor of Geography in 1992, and founded the Penn State GeoVISTA Center in 1998. In 2007, he was a Visiting Professor at the Stanford University. He became an Affiliate Professor of Information Sciences and Technology at Penn State in 2007. He retired in 2020 and became Professor Emeritus of Geography and Information Science & Technology.

Awards for Alan MacEachren in 2004-2007 include the E. Willard and Ruby S. Miller Professor of Geography, College of Earth and Mineral Science, Penn State University. He became an Honorary Fellow of the International Cartographic Association in 2005, making him only the sixth Fellow from the U.S. since 1974. In 2004, he was also recognized for Exceptional Scholarly Contributions to the Practice of Cartography, by the Canadian Cartographic Association.

== See also ==
- 2.5D
- Animated mapping
- Figure-ground in map design
- History of cartography
- Spatial analysis
- Theresa-Marie Rhyne

== Publications ==
Alan MacEachren has written several books and articles. A selection:

- 1994. Visualization in modern cartography. With D.R. Fraser (ed.). Taylor.
- 1995. How maps work : representation, visualization, and design How maps work : representation,
- 1994. Some truth with maps : a primer on symbolization and design
- 1997. Rediscovering Geography: New Relevance for the New Century. With 13 other authors. Washington, D. C.: National Academy of Science Press.
- 2005. Exploring Geovisualization. With Jason Dykes and M.J. Kraak. International Cartographic Association.
- 2005. Illuminating the Path: The Research and Development Agenda for Visual Analytics. With 25 other authors. Pacific Northwest National Laboratory and Department of Homeland Security.
