= Cornelis Koeman =

Dutch university professor (1918–2006)

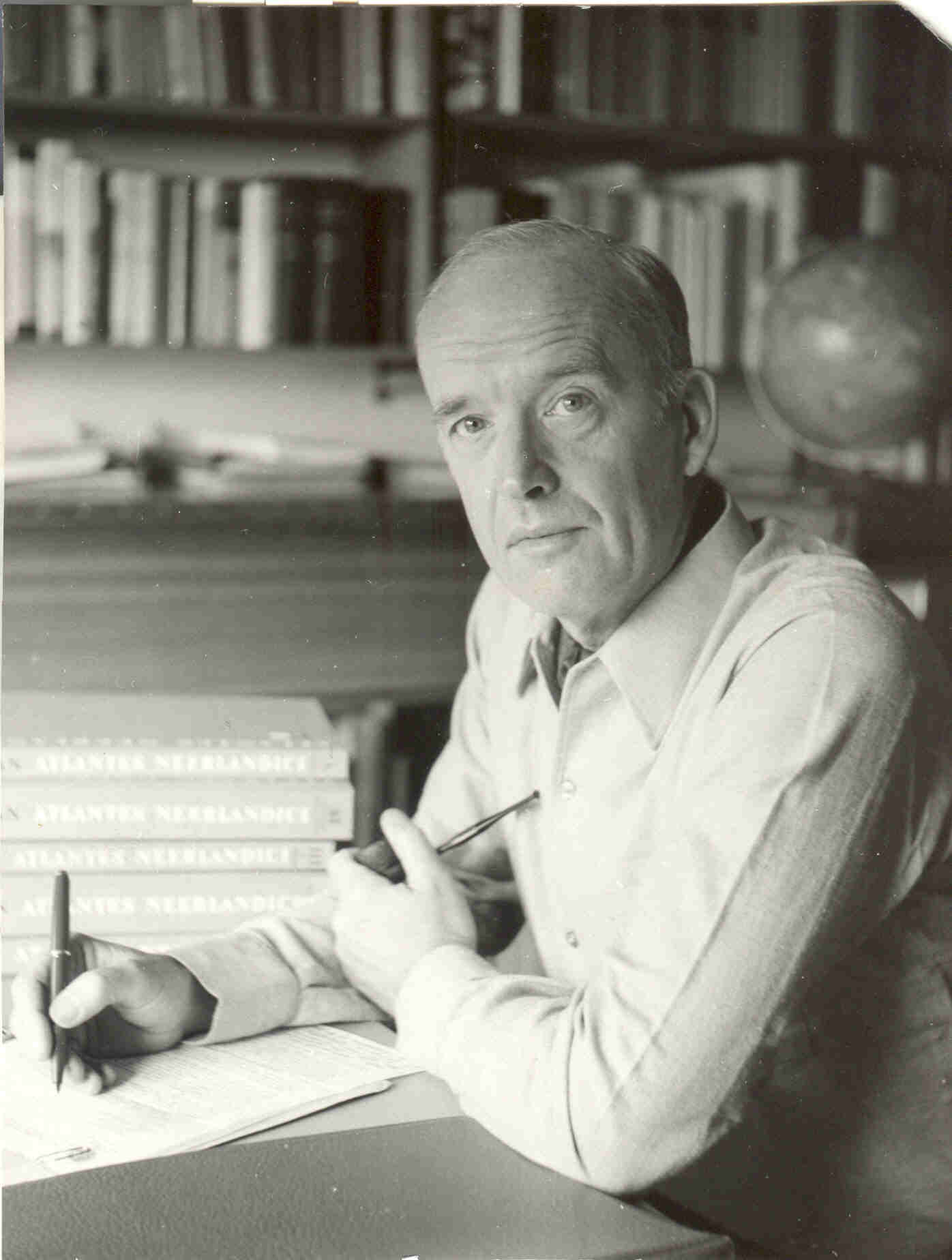
Cor Koeman

Cornelis Koeman (Wijdenes, 15 August 1918 – De Bilt, 5 June 2006) was a Dutch geodetic engineer and cartographer, famous for his work on the history of cartography.

== Biography ==
Cor Koeman was born as son of Teun Koeman, gardener, and Grietje Ham. He wanted to become a surveyor and took lessons with P.Th.M. Velseboer, working at the Land Registry. As early as 1938, he was appointed as a prospective surveyor at the Survey Department of Rijkswaterstaat in Delft. In addition, he was given facilities for following lectures for civil surveyors at the Delft University of Technology. He completed that training in 1946. Then he went for the engineering title that was obtained in 1950. In the meantime, Koeman had been appointed teacher in Geodesy in Delft. In 1957 he was appointed cartography teacher at Utrecht University. He moved to the Bilt. In 1961 Koeman obtained his doctorate with a thesis entitled: Collections of maps and atlases in the Netherlands. From 1968 to 1981 Cornelis Koeman was professor of cartography and geodesy at the University of Utrecht. He ensured the introduction of a separate specialization in cartography. Right at the start of his professorship in 1968, Koeman came up with a completely new interpretation of the subject of cartography. He based this on the book Sémiologie graphique by the French cartographer Jacques Bertin, which had been published in 1967. Until its abolition in 2002, approximately 250 students graduated in the field of cartography.

Koeman and his colleague F.L.T. van der Weiden set up a cartographic research program, focusing on photo maps, digital cartography and generalization (adjusting the map image and map content to the purpose and scale of a map). His work had an important social impact.

== History of cartography ==
More than on cartography itself, he left his mark on the practice of the history of cartography. He has played an exemplary role in this worldwide. The idea arose as early as 1960 to compile a bibliography of all land and sea atlases published in the Netherlands until 1940. The first of the six-volume Atlantes Neerlandici was completed in 1967. This publication has served as a model for similar bibliographic initiatives elsewhere in the world. His Geschiedenis van de kartografie van Nederland (History of Cartography of the Netherlands), published in 1983, is still the most important handbook in this field. Koeman was also editor of the renowned magazine for the history of cartography Imago Mundi . His collection of atlases has been gifted to the University of Leiden.

== Functions ==
He was one of the founders in 1958 of the Cartographic Section of the Royal Dutch Geographical Society (KNAG), which became an independent Netherlands Association for Cartography (NVK) in 1975. He was secretary of this NVK predecessor from 1958 to 1964. He was one of the representatives of the Netherlands at the founding meeting of the International Cartographic Association (ICA) in Bern in 1959, was chairman of the ICA Standing Commission on Education and Training from 1972 to 1980, and as such was jointly responsible for the production of the international cartography textbook Basic Cartography.

== Bibliography ==
A list of all his publications can be found on the Dutch Wikipedia article at Cornelis Koeman

== Literature ==
- F.J. Ormeling. De kartering van Nederland tot het jaar 2000, verslag van het symposium gehouden ter gelegenheid van het afscheid van prof. dr. ir. C. Koeman van het Geografisch Instituut van de Utrechtse Rijksuniversiteit op 29 september 1981. Rijksuniversiteit Utrecht, 1981. (Dutch)
- Cornelis Koeman (1918-2006). In: Imago Mundi, vol 59, part 1, p. 105-116. Obituary.
