= D. R. Fraser Taylor =

Canadian geographer and academic (1937–2025)

D.R. Fraser Taylor OC FRSC
- Born: David Ruxton Fraser Taylor; 1937; Leven, Fife, Scotland
- Died: March 22, 2025 (aged 87–88)
- Awards: Fellow of the Royal Society of Canada; Killam Prize; Carl Mannerfelt Gold Medal

Academic background
- Education: University of Edinburgh

Academic work
- Discipline: Cartography; Geography; International development
- Institutions: Carleton University
- Website: Geomatics and Cartographic Research Centre

David Ruxton Fraser Taylor, OC FRSC (1937 – March 22, 2025) was a Scottish-born Canadian cartographer, geographer, and academic, who was Chancellor's Distinguished Research Professor of International Affairs Geography and Environmental Studies at Carleton University, Canada and a Fellow of the Royal Society of Canada. Taylor studied applications of cartography to development, including international development. He was best known for his work on Cybercartography. Taylor died on March 22, 2025.

== Research ==
Taylor engaged in research and development in the theory and practice of Cybercartography; electronic atlases, interactive cartographic systems and visualization; the preservation and archiving of geospatial data, including Case Study 06, Cybercartographic Atlas of Antarctica, with the InterPARES Project (Phase 2); and Canada’s international policies toward developing nations.

== Honours ==
In 2008, Dr. Taylor was elected a Fellow of the Royal Society of Canada. In 2013, he was awarded the Carl Mannerfelt Gold Medal by the International Cartographic Association, for which he served as President from 1987 to 1995. In 2014, Dr. Taylor was awarded the prestigious Killam Prize for the Social Sciences for his work in developing Cybercartography. He was appointed to the Order of Canada in 2021. He died on March 22, 2025.

== Selected book publications ==
- Taylor, D. R.F., Series General Editor, Modern Cartography Series. Amsterdam: Elsevier, 1991–Present
- Taylor, D. R. F., ed., Anonby, E., Murasugi, K., assoc. eds.Further Developments in the Theory and Practice of Cybercartography: International Dimensions and Language Mapping. Amsterdam: Elsevier, 2019.
- Pyne, S. and Taylor, D. R. F., Cybercartography in a Reconciliation Community: Engaging Intersecting Perspectives. Amsterdam: Elsevier, 2019.
- Taylor, D. R. F., ed., Lauriault, T., assoc. ed. Developments in the Theory and Practice of Cybercartography. Amsterdam: Elsevier, 2014.
- Taylor, D. R. F., ed. Cybercartography: Theory and Practice. Amsterdam: Elsevier, 2005.
- Taylor, D. R. F., ed. Policy Issues in Modern Cartography. Amsterdam: Elsevier, 1998.
- MacEachren, A. and Taylor, D. R. F., eds. Visualization in Modern Cartography. New York: Elsevier, 1994.
- Taylor, D. R. F., ed., series ed. Education and Training in Contemporary Cartography. Chichester: Wiley, 1985.
- Taylor, D. R. F., and Stohr, W., eds. Development from Above or Below: The Dialectics of Regional Planning in Developing Countries. London: Wiley. 1981.
