= Commission on Maps and the Internet =

The Maps and the Internet Commission of the International Cartographic Association (or simply Maps and the Internet Commission) was created in 1999 as one of the standing commissions of the International Cartographic Association. It promotes multi-national cartographic research in order to solve problems related to web-based cartography. The commission enhances cartographic education related to the Internet. In addition, the commission promotes professional and technical standards for maps available through the Internet.

Like all commissions of the International Cartographic Association, formal members are assigned by individual countries. However, anyone can become a corresponding member. Corresponding members receive all commission correspondence and invitations to meetings. Activities of the commission include e-mails to members, meetings, workshops, promotion of standards, and publications.

== Commission background ==
The Internet has redefined how maps are used (see Web mapping). No longer restricted to paper, maps are transmitted almost instantly and delivered to the user in a fraction of the time required to distribute maps on paper. They are viewed in a more timely fashion. Some maps, such as those showing weather patterns, are updated continuously throughout the day. It is the interactive nature of the Internet map that is considered the most important development. Online maps are accessed through a hyperlinking structure that makes it possible to engage the map user on a higher-level than is possible with a map on paper. The Internet is making it possible to more easily distribute cartographic displays such as map animations. The Internet presents the map user with both a faster method of map distribution and different forms of mapping.

== Commission Terms of Reference ==
- Focus attention on disseminating maps and spatial data through distributed electronic networks. Product: Journal articles and web pages.
- Examine Internet map usage to better serve user needs. Product: Oral or published report.
- Examine the use of new Internet mapping technologies for social interaction and empowerment with online maps. Product: Oral or published report.
- Examine differences in the application of Internet maps between countries. Product: Oral or published report.
- Examine the potential of Internet map metadata. Product: Oral or published report.
- Promote the exchange of information about effective Internet mapping for an international audience. Collaboration / coordination with the ICA commission on visualization and virtual environments. Product: Workshop(s) and web pages.
- Promote instruction on Internet mapping through collaboration / coordination with agencies for research and mapping. Product: Materials to be used in workshops.

== Research Questions ==
Broader research questions associated with the commission:

- Determine the extent and type of Internet map usage. It is difficult to determine the number of maps that are distributed through the web. This effort could culminate in a 'map counter' that would estimate the number of maps that have been so distributed, on a regular basis.
- How are maps being used? Research is needed that examines the users in order to determine how cartographers can better serve their needs.
- Promote international user interfaces for maps on the web. This would involve developing an iconic vocabulary of map symbols that are simple and clear, and a consistent color vocabulary.
- Promote the creation of international web map servers. International web map servers would distributed maps that could be used by an international audience.
- Develop a database of web maps with specific themes or authors, areas (coordinates), resolution, dates, etc. A large number of maps reside on the web but it is difficult to find them, and particularly to find anything out about them. Maps on the web should be accompanied by a metafile with a description of the contents (e.g. map, soils, Netherlands, 1987, in a standardized format like MARC 2). The metafiles would be aggregated into a database that would point to map files available on the web without having to go to each home page.
- Develop guidelines for the design of web maps. Initially this might focus on the relatively common static maps, and perhaps offer some suggestions about fonts, colors, avoiding things that retard downloading, etc.
- Develop instructional materials (syllabi, topics, exercises, project websites, etc.) for Internet cartography. Many instructional materials are already available on the web. This effort would involve making these materials available from a central source.
- Collaborative map use through the web. How can maps delivered through the Internet be used by groups of people in collaborative problem-solving.
- Delivering cartographic data and services through the Internet. Cartographic data sets are huge, and the distributed processing times are not compatible with the computational complexity of our cartographic modeling operations. Methods need to be found to distribute cartographic data more efficiently.

== Meetings of the Commission ==
The commission meets annually. Past meetings have been held in Orleans, France; Orlando, Florida (2010); Valparaiso, Chile (2009); Warsaw, Poland (2007); Seoul, Korea (2006); Madrid, Spain (2005); Tokyo, Japan (2004); Stellenbosch, South Africa (2003); Karlsruhe, Germany (2002); Guangzhou, China (2001); Knoxville, Tennessee (2000) and; Ottawa, Canada (1999).

== Workshops ==
With the support of host institutions, the commission offers instructional workshops that cover online mapping. Workshops have been offered at universities or government mapping institutions in Malaysia, Germany, Austria, Cuba, Brazil, China, Canada, South Africa and USA. Workshops can be as short as half a day or up to two weeks.

== Publications ==
- International Perspectives on Maps and the Internet (2007) Berlin: Springer Verlag.
- Maps and the Internet (2006) Amsterdam, Cambridge: Elsevier Press, 454 p. (Paperback)
- Maps and the Internet (2003) Amsterdam, Cambridge: Elsevier Press, 454 p.

== Commission Chairs ==
- 2019–current: Otakar Čerba, University of West Bohemia
- 2011–2019: Rex Cammack, University of Nebraska at Omaha
- 1999–2011: Michael Peterson, University of Nebraska at Omaha
