= Armadillo projection =

Compromise map projection

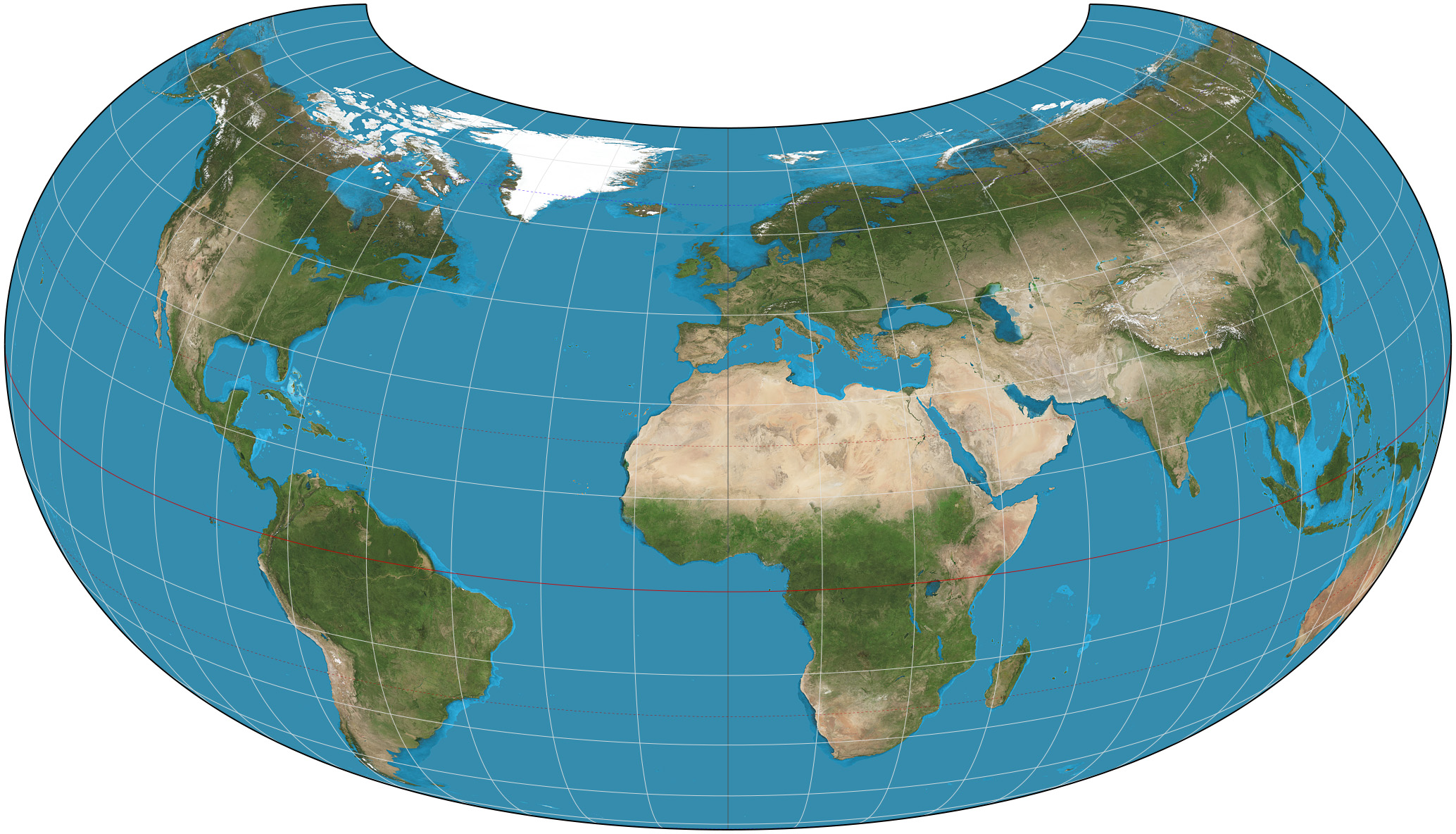
Raisz armadillo projection of the world

Tissot indicatrix on Raisz armadillo projection, 15° graticule. Color shows angular deformation and areal inflation/deflation in a bivariate scheme: The lighter the color, the less distortion. The redder, the more angular distortion. The greener, the more areal inflation or deflation.

The armadillo projection is a map projection used for world maps. It is neither conformal nor equal-area but instead affords a view evoking a perspective projection while showing most of the globe instead of the half or less that a perspective would. The projection was presented in 1943 by Erwin Raisz (1893–1968) as part of a series of "orthoapsidal" projections, which are perspectives of the globe projected onto various surfaces. This entry in the series has the globe projected onto the outer half of half a torus. Raisz singled it out and named it the "armadillo" projection.

The toroidal shape and the angle it is viewed from tend to emphasize continental areas by eliminating or foreshortening swaths of ocean. In Raisz's original presentation, the torus is tilted so that New Zealand and Antarctica cannot be seen, as in the images here. However, in publications, the projection often develops a "pigtail" which shows the rest of Australia as well as New Zealand.

Raisz coined the term orthoapsidal as a combination of orthographic and apsidal. He used it to mean drawing a parallel-meridian network, or graticule, on any suitable solid other than a sphere, and then making an orthographic projection of that.

== Formulas ==
Given a radius of sphere R, central meridian λ_{0} and a point with geographical latitude φ and longitude λ, plane coordinates x and y can be computed using the following formulas:

$$\begin{align} x &= R\left(1+\cos \varphi\right)\sin\frac{\lambda-\lambda_0}{2}\\
y &= R\left(\frac{1+\sin 20^\circ - \cos 20^\circ}{2} + \sin \varphi \cos 20^\circ - \left(1 + \cos \varphi \right) \sin 20^\circ \cos \frac{\lambda-\lambda_0}{2} \right)\\
\varphi_\mathrm{s} &= -\tan^{-1}\left(\frac{\cos\frac{\lambda-\lambda_0}{2}}{\tan 20^\circ}\right)\end{align}$$

In this formulation, no latitude more southerly than φ_{s} should be plotted for the given longitude. The y-axis coincides with the central meridian.

== See also ==
- List of map projections
