= New Humanity =

UK magazine

New Humanity Journal
- Editor: Johan Quanjer
- Categories: New Age magazine
- Frequency: Monthly
- Founded: 1975
- Final issue: 2001
- Country: United Kingdom
- Based in: London
- Language: English
- ISSN: 0307-0980

The New Humanity was a British New Age magazine founded in February 1975 by the Dutch writer Johan Henri Quanjer (1934 – 2001). It styled itself as "the world's first politico-spiritual journal for the free & independent thinker" with the maxim "neither Left nor Right but Uplifted Forward." Its articles covered a wide range of New Age topics relating to the improvement of humanity through new consciousness awareness. It came to call its platform Pneumatocracy or rule of the spirit. It supported the European Union as a progressive force in the world. The magazine ceased publication in 2001 on the death of its founder.
