= Erwin Raisz =

Hungarian-born American cartographer

Erwin Josephus Raisz
- Born: 1 March 1893; Lőcse, Hungary
- Died: 1 December 1968 (aged 75); Bangkok, Thailand
- Education: Columbia University (M.A.), (PhD)
- Known for: artful and insightful cartography
- Scientific career
- Fields: cartography, geography, geology
- Workplaces: Institute of Geographical Exploration at Harvard University

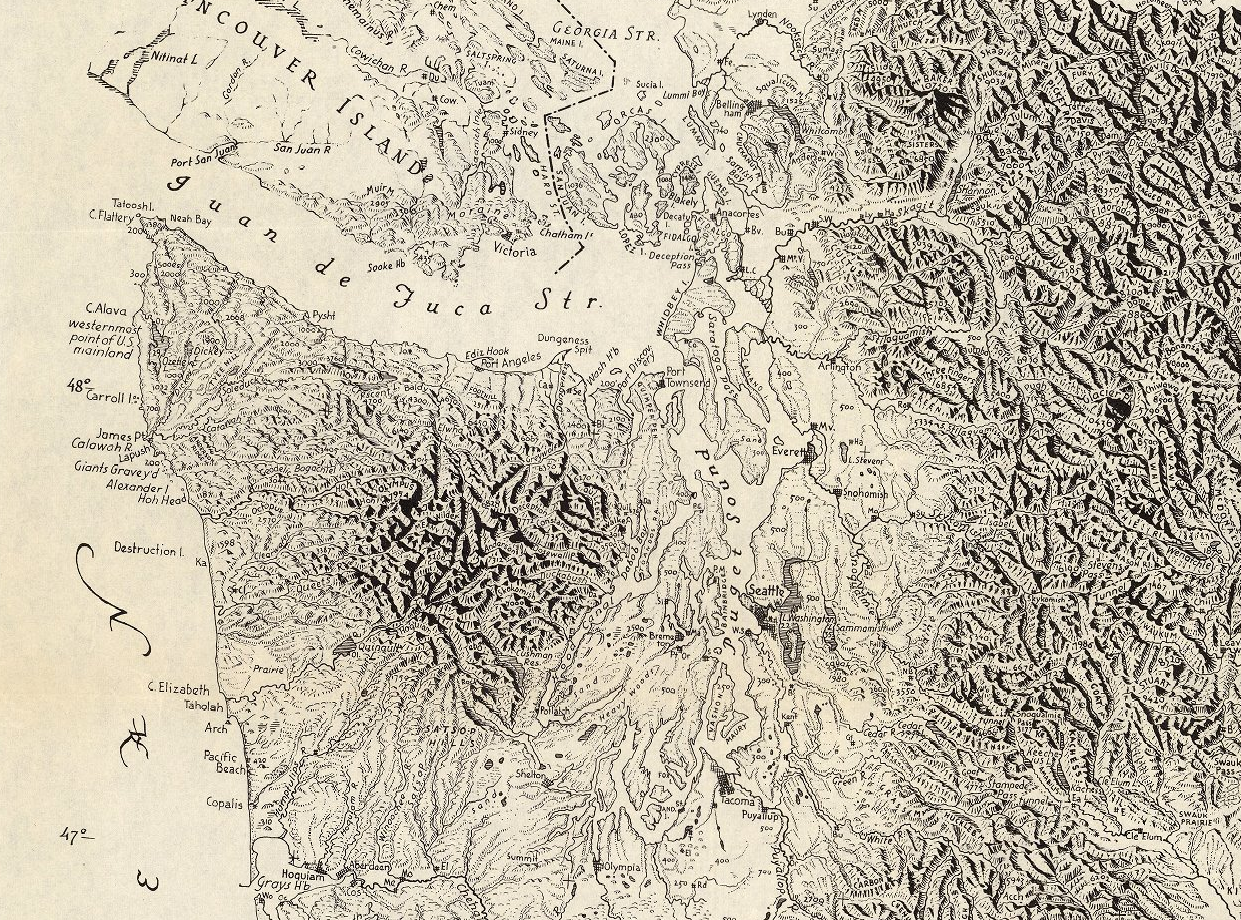
Olympic Peninsula and Puget Sound 1941

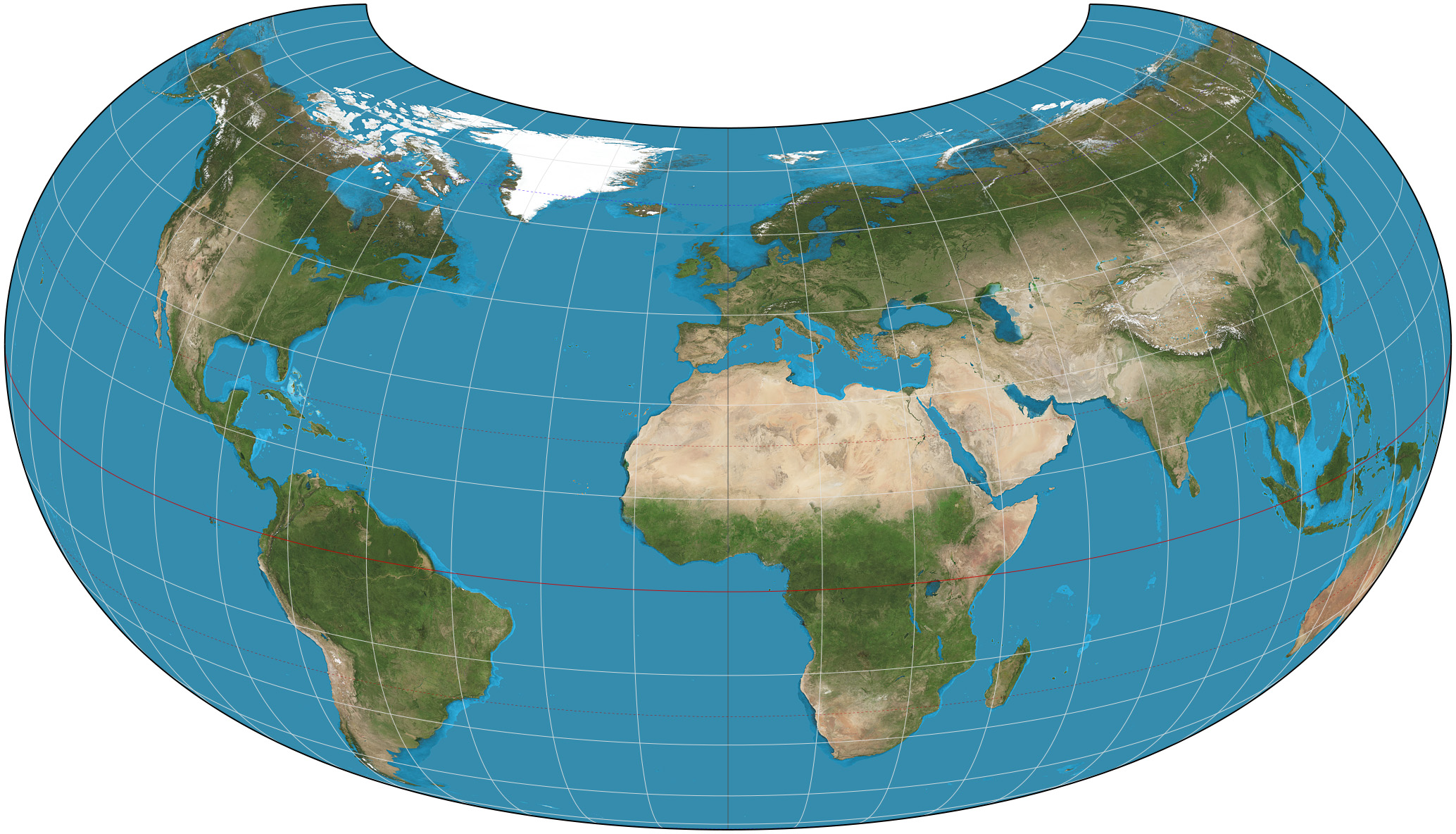
Armadillo Projection

Erwin Raisz (1 March 1893, Lőcse, Hungary – 1 December 1968, Bangkok, Thailand) was a Hungarian-born American cartographer, best known for his physiographic maps of landforms.

== Early life and education ==
Born in Lőcse, Hungary (now part of Slovakia) in 1893, Raisz was the son of a civil engineer who introduced him to maps through his work. He received his degree in civil engineering and architecture from the Budapest University of Technology and Economics (Royal Polytechnicum) in Budapest in 1914.

== Career ==
Raisz served in the army during World War I, and emigrated to New York in 1923. He worked for the Ohman Map Company while studying for his 1929 Ph.D. at Columbia University. He offered a course in cartography while a student, one of the first such in the United States.

In 1931 he joined the Institute of Geographical Exploration at Harvard University, where he taught cartography and was curator of the map collection for 20 years. He created a significant body of work using hand-drawn pen-and-ink techniques, which during that period were largely being replaced by photo-mechanical processes and scribing. Because they were hand-drawn, his maps and graphics have a distinctive look to them, unique to his hand.

He was author of the first cartography textbook in English, General cartography (1938).

Raisz is best known for his physiographic maps, which describe landforms using his "orthoapsidal" Armadillo projection (essentially a small-scale variation on an isometric projection). Created for continents, nations and states, they form a solid corpus of work whose use continues today. Raisz Landform Maps, operated by his family, continues to publish much of his work.

== Later life and death ==
He travelled extensively for his work and died in Bangkok on December 1, 1968, en route to present a paper at the 11th International Geographical Congress meeting in New Delhi.

== Sources ==
- Biography of Raisz on the Raisz Landform Maps web site.
- Designerati: Cartographers - Erwin Raisz
- Robinson, Arthur H. (March 1970). "Erwin Josephus Raisz, 1893–1968". Annals of the Association of American Geographers. 60 (1): 189–93. doi:10.1111/j.1467-8306.1970.tb00712.x. ISSN 0004-5608.
- ICC-Preconference-Workshop: Atlases and Infographics, Tokyo, 2019/07/13 Erwin Raisz‘ Atlases – an early multi-method approach to cartographic communication, by Eric Losang of Leibniz Institute fur Landerkunde (Leibniz Association)

== Bibliography ==
- Raisz, Erwin Josephus (1938). General Cartography. McGraw-Hill Series in Geography. New York; London: McGraw-Hill Book Company. LCCN 39027007.
- Raisz, Erwin Josephus (1948). General Cartography. McGraw-Hill Series in Geography (2nd ed.). New York: McGraw-Hill Book Company. LCCN 48009621.
- Raisz, Erwin Josephus (1962). Principles of Cartography. New York: McGraw-Hill Book Company.
