= Epe, Netherlands =

Epe
- Municipality
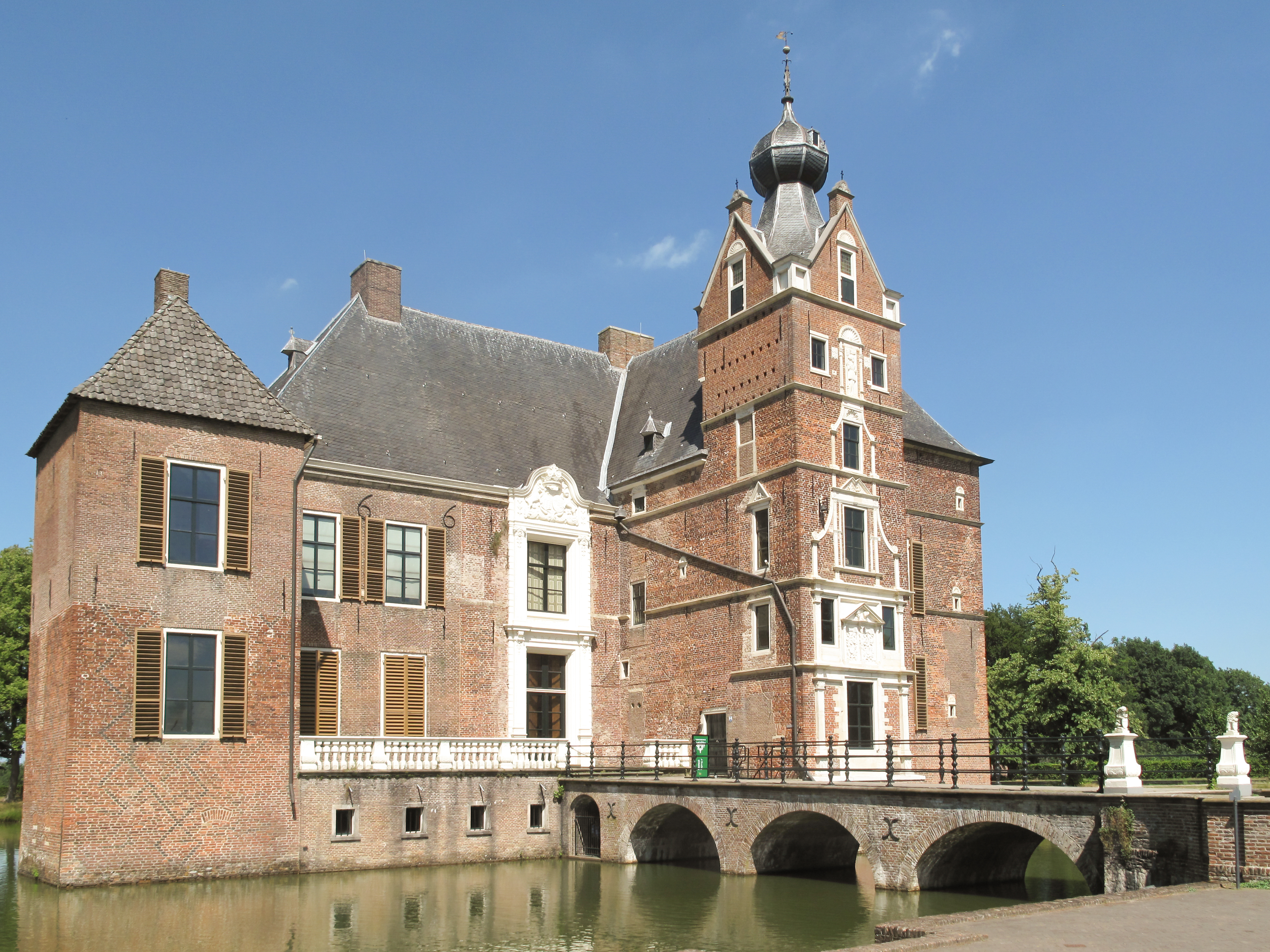
- Cannenburgh Castle

- Flag Coat of arms

- Location in Gelderland
- Coordinates: 52°21′N 5°59′E
- Country: Netherlands
- Province: Gelderland

Government
  - Body: Municipal council
  - Mayor: Hans van der Hoeve (VVD)

Area
  - Total: 157.37 km^{2} (60.76 sq mi)
  - Land: 156.07 km^{2} (60.26 sq mi)
  - Water: 1.30 km^{2} (0.50 sq mi)
- Elevation: 13 m (43 ft)

Population (January 2021)
  - Total: 33,198
  - Density: 213/km^{2} (550/sq mi)
- Demonym(s): Epenaar, Eper
- Time zone: UTC+1 (CET)
  - Summer (DST): UTC+2 (CEST)
- Postcode: 8160–8172
- Area code: 0578
- Website: www.epe.nl

Epe (Dutch pronunciation: [ˈeːpə]) is a municipality and a town in the eastern Netherlands.

The municipality has a population of 32,191 Epenaren (2015, source: CBS), and the town itself has a population of 15,552. The town hall stands in Epe, which is situated about 16 km (9.9 mi) north of Apeldoorn and 21 km (13 mi) south of Zwolle.

Another important town within the municipality is Vaassen (12,739 inhabitants), halfway between Epe and Apeldoorn. It has an interesting castle called 'Kasteel De Cannenburgh', which is open to visitors (guided tour compulsory). Epe, Vaassen and also the village of Oene each have a medieval church. Other population centres of interest are Emst, Gortel, Tongeren, Wissel and Zuuk.

== International relations ==
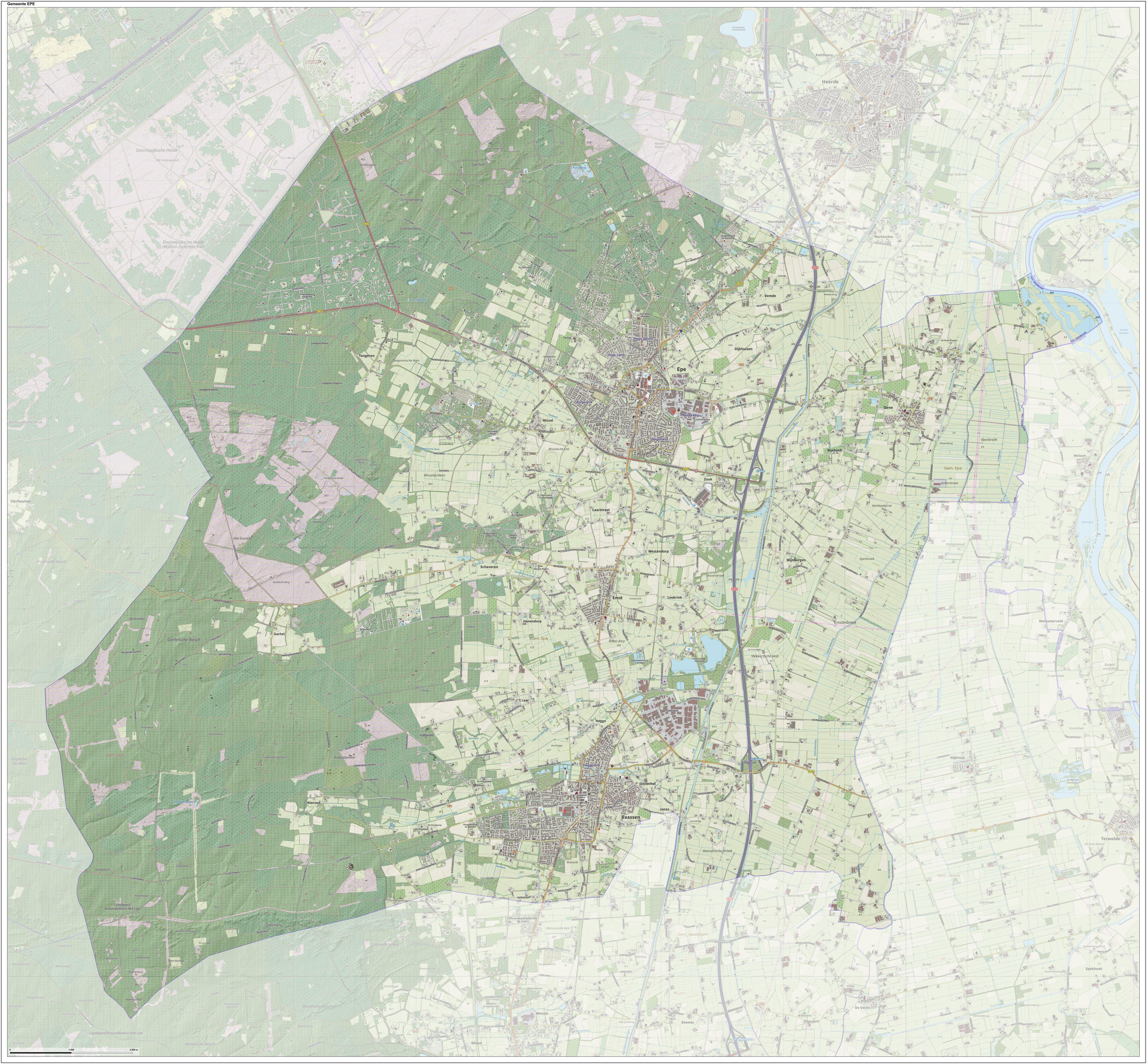
Dutch Topographic map of Epe, June 2015

=== Twin towns — sister cities ===
Epe is twinned with:

- Gronau, North Rhine-Westphalia, Germany
- Rajecké Teplice, Slovakia

== Notable people ==
- Antonie Pannekoek (1873 in Vaassen – 1960) a Dutch astronomer, Marxist theorist and social revolutionary
- Henry G. Schermers (1928 in Epe – 2006) lawyer and academic
- Menno-Jan Kraak (born 1958 in Vaassen) a Dutch cartographer and academic
- Esther Hart (born 1970 in Epe) singer

=== Sport ===
- Marc Overmars (born 1973 in Emst) football player with 399 club caps
- John Stegeman (born 1976 in Epe) former footballer and manager of Willem II
- Teun Mulder (born 1981 in Zuuk) track cyclist, bronze medallist at the 2012 Summer Olympics
