= Zuuk =

- Hamlet
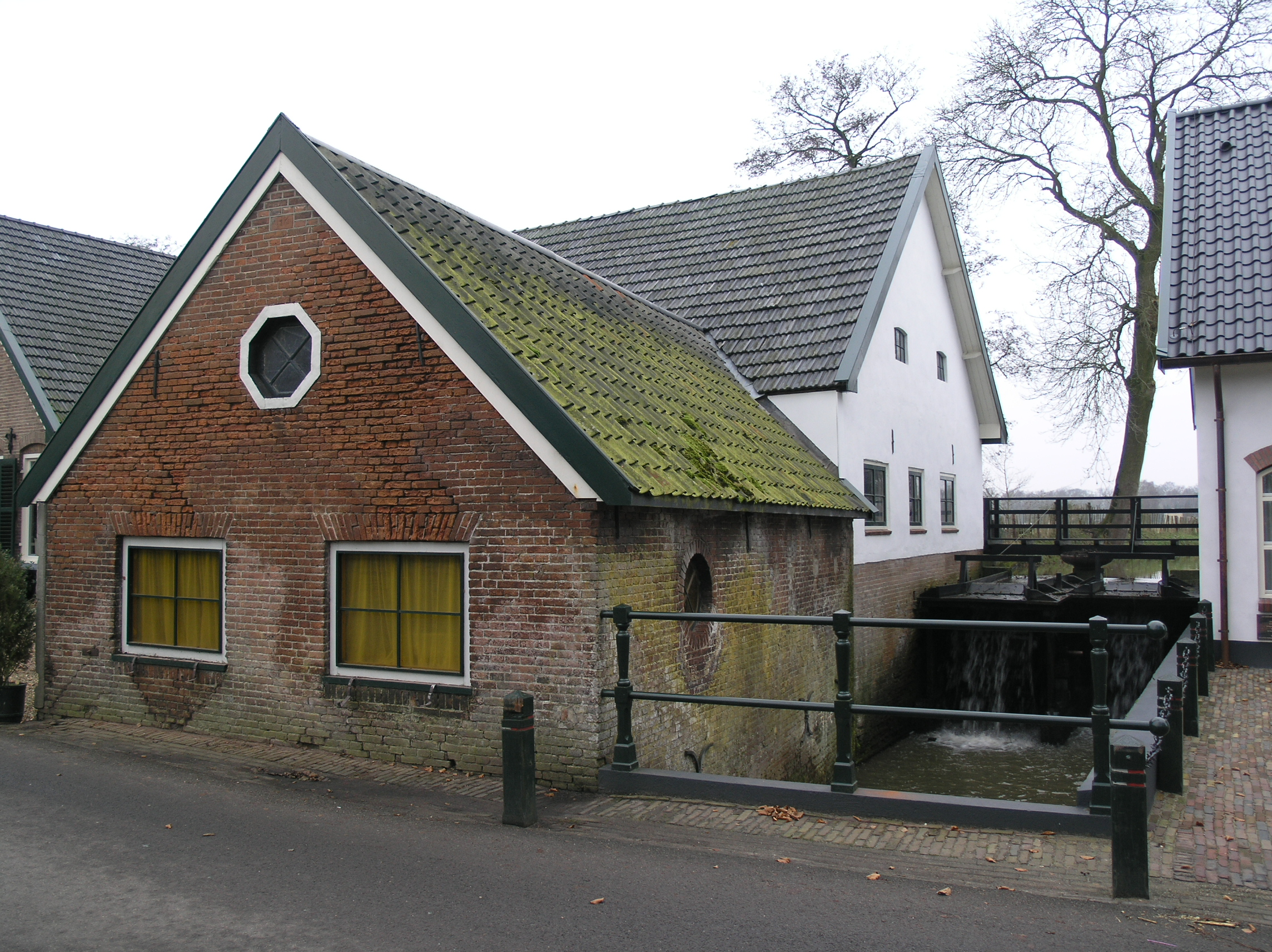
- Watermill Zuukermolen

- Location in the province of Gelderland Zuuk (Netherlands)
- Coordinates: 52°20′4″N 6°0′12″E
- Country: Netherlands
- Province: Gelderland
- Municipality: Epe
- Elevation: 17 m (56 ft)
- Time zone: UTC+1 (CET)
  - Summer (DST): UTC+2 (CEST)
- Postal code: 8161
- Dialing code: 0578

Zuuk is a hamlet in the Netherlands, south of Zwolle, in the province of Gelderland in the municipality of Epe.

== History ==
It was mentioned around 1390 as Groot en Klein-Zwtwike, and means "southern neighbourhood". It is not a statistical entity, and the postal authorities have placed it under Epe. In 1840, it was home to 533 people. Nowadays, it consists of about 150 houses.

In the 17th century, there were several paper mills in Zuuk. The Zuukermolen is a watermill which was originally from the 18th century. In 1990, it was restored, and generates electricity. The hamlet was cut in two by the construction of the A50 motorway.

== Notable people ==
- Teun Mulder (born 1981), track cyclist
