= Eduard Imhof =

Swiss cartographer

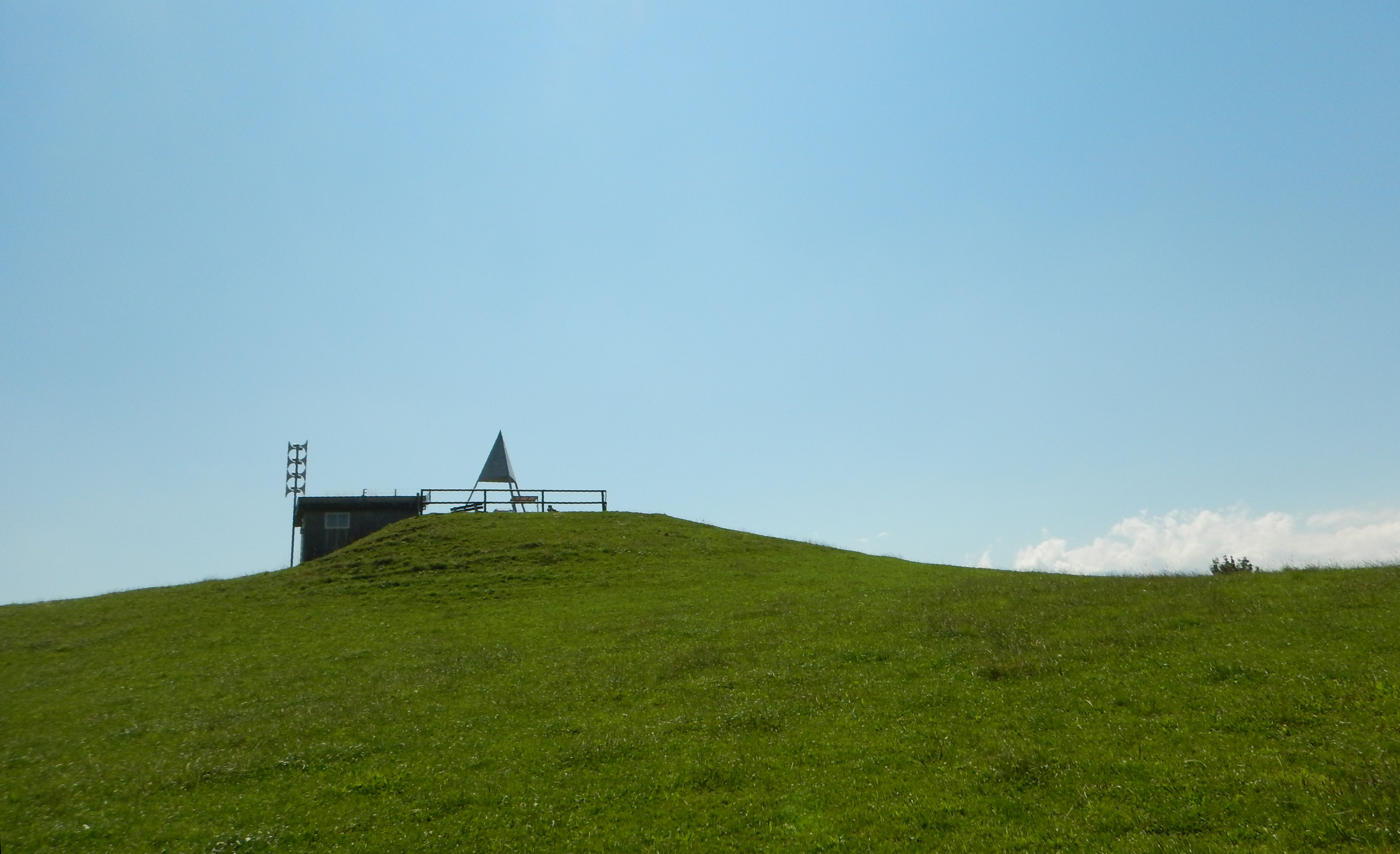
Eduard Imhof memorial on Lueghubel in Fahrni municipality, Switzerland

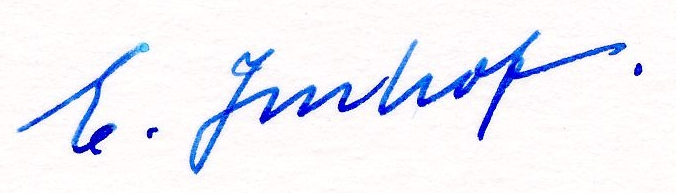
Eduard Imhof's signature

Eduard Imhof (25 January 1895, Schiers – 27 April 1986) was a professor of cartography at the Swiss Federal Institute of Technology, Zürich, from 1925 to 1965. His fame, which extends far beyond the Institute of Technology, stems from his relief shading work on school maps and atlases. Between 1922 and 1973 Imhof worked on many school maps. He drew and shaded maps of Switzerland as well her various cantons and the Austrian province of Vorarlberg.

== Biography ==
Eduard Imhof was born in Schiers, a town in eastern Switzerland. His father, also Eduard Imhof, was a geographer who taught at a local college. In 1902 the family moved to Zurich, were Imhof continued his schooling. In 1914 he began studying surveying at the Swiss Federal Institute of Technology, continuing until 1919. Whilst a student his studies where sometimes interrupted by military duty guarding the Swiss border as a lieutenant of artillery. During the Second World War he would return to military service in 1939 and serve occasionally until 1945, eventually gaining the rank of major.

Upon earning his diploma as a surveyor in 1919 Imhof began working as a faculty member at the Institute of Geodesy at the Swiss Federal Institute of Technology. In 1922 he married Agnes Untersander and between 1922 and 1935 they had four children together. In 1925 he was appointed the first Swiss Professor of Cartography and founded the Cartographic Institute in Zurich.

In 1927 Imhof was tasked with revising the Schweizerischer Mittelschulatlas, the atlas used in Swiss high schools. All editions of the Schweizerischer Mittelschulatlas published from 1932 until 1976 were under his direction. The Swiss primary school atlas, the Schweizerischer Sekundarschulatlas, published between 1934 and 1975, were also produced under his direction.

Imhof spent several weeks living in a Tibetan monastery in 1930 while he was measuring the height and position of Minya Konka. On this expedition he was accompanied by Paul Nabholz and Arnold Heim. In 1951 he travelled to Ankara to work on surveying Turkey for the Turkish Office for Land Surveying (Harita Genel Müdürlügü). In 1954 he married Viola May and that same year made an ascent of Mount Ararat.

In 1959 he was instrumental in founding the International Cartographic Association, becoming their first president from 1961 to 1964. He retired from teaching academically in 1965, but continued to give lectures and accept many awards for his lifetime of achievement until his death in 1986 in Erlenbach, following a short illness.

== Awards ==
- 1938 Prinz-Ludwig Medal in silver of the Geographical Society in Munich.
- 1947 Silver medal of the Société Royale Belge de Géographie
- 1949 Awarded an honorary Doctorate of Philosophy from the University of Zurich for his work as a cartographer.
- 1964 Livingstone Medal of the Royal Scottish Geographical Society
- 1967 Patron's Medal of the Royal Geographical Society of London.
- 1970 Alexander von Humboldt Medal in gold of the Gesellschaft für Erdkunde zu Berlin.
- 1979 Carl Mannerfelt Gold Medal of the International Cartographic Association.
