= Jacques Bertin =

Cartographer and visualization theorist

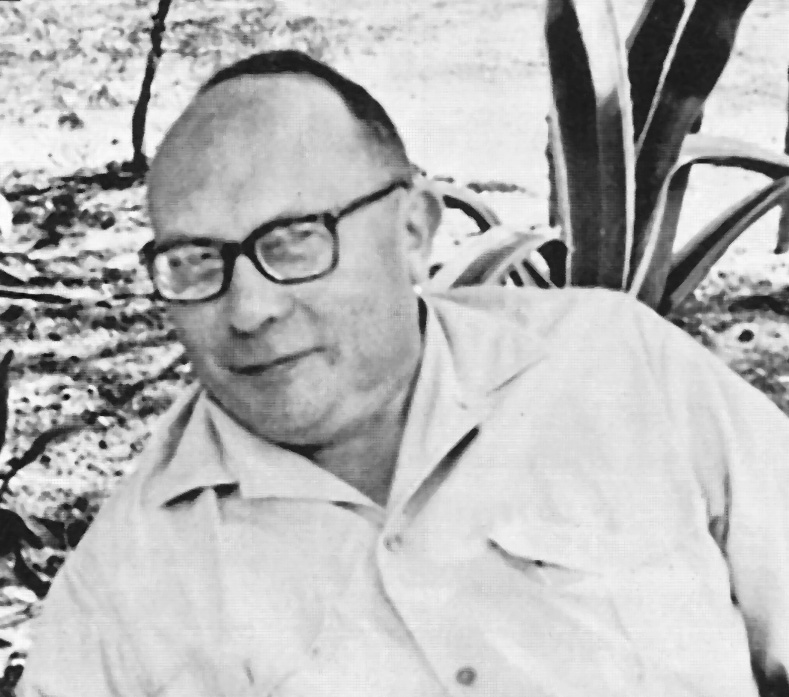
- Born: 27 July 1918; Maisons-Laffitte, Yvelines
- Died: 3 May 2010 (aged 91); Paris, France
- Occupation(s): Cartographer, Theorist

Jacques Bertin (27 July 1918 – 3 May 2010) was a French cartographer and theorist, known from his book Sémiologie Graphique (Semiology of Graphics), published in 1967. This monumental work, based on his experience as a cartographer and geographer, represents the first and widest intent to provide a theoretical foundation to Information Visualization, with his most lasting contribution being his set of visual variables that can be used to construct map symbols and other graphical techniques one of then being the Bertin Projection, an innovative map projection type, or to seriate them (the Bertin Matrix).

Bertin (1953) map projection

== Biography ==
Jacques Bertin was born in 1918 in Maisons-Laffitte, Yvelines. When he was 10, he received the first prize of cartography at primary school. He never had problems with drawing, and pursued interests including architecture, the teaching of drawing and cartography. Finally he ended up studying geography and cartography at the Sorbonne.

He became founder and director of the Cartographic Laboratory of the École pratique des hautes études (EPHE) in 1954 and director of studies (directeur d'études) in 1957. In 1967 he became professor of the Sorbonne, and in 1974 he became director of studies and director of the Geographical Laboratory of the École des hautes études en sciences sociales (EHESS), which is part of the École pratique des hautes études (EPHE, VIe Section). Later in the 1970s he became head of research at the Centre national de la recherche scientifique (CNRS).

In 1993 Bertin received the "Mercator-Medaille der Deutschen Gesellschaft für Kartographie" and in 1999 the Carl Mannerfelt Gold Medal from the International Cartographic Association.

Bertin died in Paris on 3 May 2010.

== Publications ==
Jacques Bertin has published numerous scientific maps, papers and articles on map making, semiology, graphical information and graphic processing.

- 1967. Sémiologie Graphique. Les diagrammes, les réseaux, les cartes. With Marc Barbut [et al.]. Paris : Gauthier-Villars. (Translation 1983. Semiology of Graphics by William J. Berg.)
- 1969. Etude et réalisation d'un dispositif de goniométrie et d'observation de formes d'onde, en large bande.
- 1976. Experimental and Theoretical Aspects of Induced Polarization. 2 vol. With J. Loes. Berlin : Gebruder. Borntraeger.
- 1977. Graphique et le traitement graphique de l'information. With Serge Bonin [et al.].
- 1977. La graphique et le traitement graphique de l'information. Paris : Flammarion, 1977, 273 p. (translation 1981. Graphics and graphic information-processing by William J. Berg and Paul Scott).
- 1992. Harper atlas of world history. with Pierre Vidal-Naquet. N.Y. : HarperCollins.
- 1997. Atlas historique universel. Panorama de l'histoire du monde. With J. Devisse, D. Lavallée and J. Népote. Genève : Éd. Minerve, 180 p.
- 2006. Nuovo atlante storico Zanichelli / sotto la direzione di Pierre Vidal-Naquet; direzione della cartografia.
