= Menno-Jan Kraak =

- Born: 28 March 1958 (age 68); Vaassen
- Education: Utrecht University; Delft University of Technology
- Scientific career
- Fields: Cartography; Geovisual Analytics; Geography
- Workplaces: ITC Enschede

Menno-Jan Kraak (born 28 March 1958, Vaassen) is a Dutch cartographer and professor of Geovisual Analytics and Cartography at the Faculty of Geoinformation Sciences and Earth Observation at the University of Twente. He is known for his work in cartography and his activities in the International Cartographic Association.

== Academic career ==
Menno-Jan Kraak graduated (MSc) in Cartography from Faculty of Geographical Sciences, Utrecht University in 1981. Between 1981 and 1983 he did his compulsory army service as an officer in a military geography unit.

In 1983 Kraak started to work at Faculty of Geodesy, Delft University of Technology as Assistant, and later as associate professor in cartography. In 1996 he started as full professor of cartography at ITC Enschede. Between 1998 and 2010 he was appointed as professor in New Visualization Techniques in Cartography at Department of GeoSciences, Utrecht University. In 2010, ITC became part of University of Twente and Menno-Jan became professor of Geovisual Analytics and Cartography. Currently he is head of ITC's Geoinformation Processing Department.

From 2015 to 2019, Kraak was president of the International Cartographic Association.

== Selected publications ==
- Cartography visualization of spatial data. With Ferjan Ormeling. London: Routledge / New York Guildford Press, 3rd edition, 2011. Translations to Polish (1998), Russian (2005), Indonesian (2007), and Chinese (2014). Original Dutch editions Delft University Press, 1987, 1990 and 1993.
- Web Cartography – developments and prospects. With A. Brown. London: Taylor & Francis, 2000.
- Exploring Geovisualization. With Jason Dykes and Alan M. MacEachren. Amsterdam: Elseviers /International Cartographic Association, 2005.
- Mapping Time: Illustrated by Minard's Map of Napoleon's Russian Campaign of 1812. Redlands: ESRI Press, 2014.
