= Bosatlas =

Dutch atlas

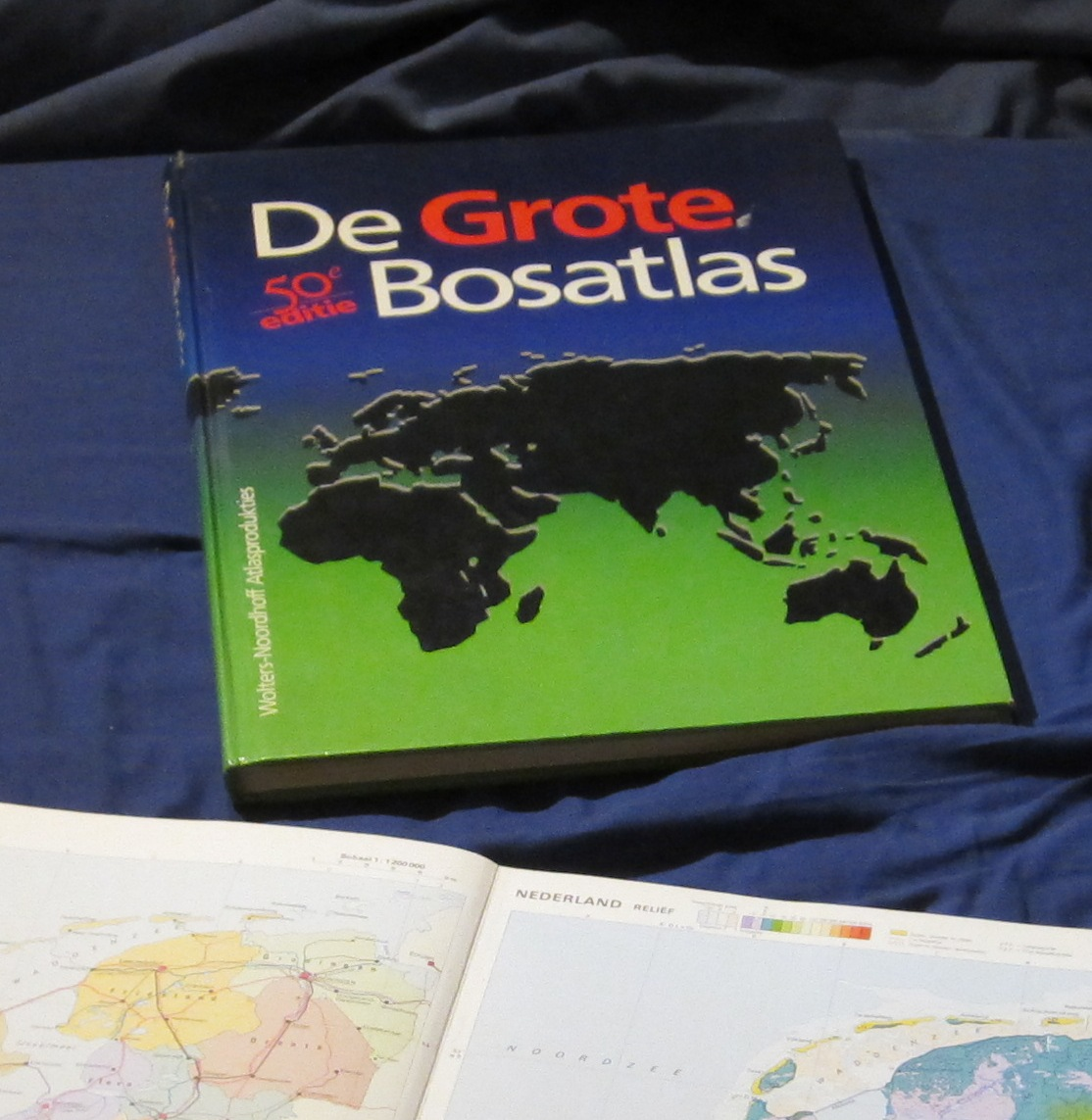
Bosatlas 1988

The Bosatlas is a Dutch atlas. Used in most schools, it remains the best selling atlas in the Netherlands.

== History ==
The atlas was started by Pieter Roelf Bos, a Groningen teacher. The first atlas was published in 1877 with the name Bos' Schoolatlas der geheele aarde (Bos's School Atlas of the Whole Earth). Later editions were commonly called Bosatlas. Bos continued to look after the production of the atlas until his death in 1902: his final production was the 15th edition. His successors were: J.F. Niermeyer (1903-1922, 16th up to and including the 27th edition), B.A. Kwast (1923-1936, from 1928 onward in cooperation with P. Eibergen, 28th up to and including the 35th edition) and P. Eibergen (1937-1955, 36th up to and including the 39th edition). The last of his successors to take individual responsibility for the Atlas was Dr. F.J. Ormeling (1956–1976, 40th up to and including the 48th edition). Since the 49th edition (1981) responsibility for the atlas has been collectively attributed and it is the publisher's name that has been highlighted in the atlas and associated marketing material.

The reason for first publication was the introduction of geography in (former) Dutch high schools. The maps were originally drawn by hand. The publisher was Jan Berend Wolters of Groningen, whose firm continues to publish the atlas as Wolters-Noordhoff.

== Variants ==
Different versions of the atlas are (or were) published, as follows.

- De Grote Bosatlas, continuation of the Bosatlas
- De Basis Bosatlas (until 2003 named De Kleine Bosatlas)
- De Junior Bosatlas
- Mijn Eerste Bosatlas
- De Wereld Bosatlas, a big atlas
- De Bosatlas van Nederland
- De Bosatlas van Fryslân
- De Bosatlas van Amsterdam

== Frisian Bosatlas ==
In November 2009, a Frisian edition, De Bosatlas van Fryslân was published, completely dedicated to the Dutch province of Friesland, with historical and modern maps, aerophotography, background information on hundreds of topics and a complete set of topographical maps, scale (1:25 000).

== Non-Dutch editions ==
Editions of the atlas have also been published in Belgium (both Dutch and French), France, Sweden and the Democratic Republic of the Congo. The standard "Grote Bosatlas", although a world atlas, provides a greatly extended level of detail and variety in respect of the Netherlands. With the non-Dutch editions this greater level of national focus is switched away from the Netherlands in favour of the country for which the edition has been prepared.
