= International Cartographic Association =

International organization

- ICA
- Abbreviation: ICA
- Formation: 1959; 67 years ago
- Type: INGO
- Region served: Worldwide
- Official language: English, French
- President: Georg Gartner
- Parent organization: International Council for Science
- Website: ICA Official website

The International Cartographic Association (ICA) (French: Association Cartographique Internationale, ACI) is an organization formed of national member organizations, to provide a forum for issues and techniques in cartography and geographic information science (GIScience). ICA was founded on June 9, 1959, in Bern, Switzerland. The first General Assembly was held in Paris in 1961. The mission of the International Cartographic Association is to promote the disciplines and professions of cartography and GIScience in an international context. To achieve these aims, the ICA works with national and international governmental and commercial bodies, and with other international scientific societies.

== Leadership ==
=== Presidents ===
The first president, Eduard Imhof of Switzerland was heavily involved in founding the association.

Term	President	From country
2023-	Georg Gartner (de)	Austria
2019-2023	Tim Trainor	United States
2015-2019	Menno-Jan Kraak	Netherlands
2011-2015	Georg Gartner (de)	Austria
2007-2011	William Cartwright	Australia
2003-2007	Milan Konečný (cs)	Czech Republic
1999-2003	Bengt Rystedt (sv)	Sweden
1995-1999	Michael Wood	United Kingdom
1987-1995	D. R. Fraser Taylor	Canada
1984-1987	Joel Morrison	United States
1976-1984	Ferdinand Jan Ormeling Sr.	Netherlands
1972-1976	Arthur H. Robinson	United States
1968-1972	Konstantin Salichtchev (ru)	Soviet Union
1964-1968	Denys Thackwell	United Kingdom
1961-1964	Eduard Imhof	Switzerland

=== Secretaries-General and Treasurers ===
The Secretary-General and Treasurer is responsible for the administration and the general running of the Association.

Term	Name	Nationality
2019-...	Thomas Schulz	Switzerland
2011-2019	László Zentai	Hungary
2007-2011	David Fairbairn	United Kingdom
1999-2007	Ferjan Ormeling Jr.	Netherlands
1991-1999	Jean-Philippe Grélot	France
1984-1991	Donald T. Pearce	Australia
1976-1984	Olof W. Hedbom	Sweden
1968-1976	Ferdinand Jan Ormeling Sr.	Netherlands
1961-1964	Erwin Gigas	West Germany

=== Executive committee ===
On 20 July 2019 member nations elected the new Executive Committee (EC) of the ICA for the 2019–2023 term. New ICA president is Tim Trainor.

== Commissions ==
To coordinate international cartographic work Commissions and Working Groups have been established. These are chaired by experts in a specific field of cartography and comprise members from the international Cartography and GIScience community.

- Commission on Art and Cartography
- Commission on Atlases
- Commission on Cartographic Heritage into the Digital
- Commission on Cartography and Children
- Commission on Cartography and Sustainable Development
- Commission on Cartography in Early Warning and Crisis Management
- Commission on Cognitive Issues in Geographic Information Visualization
- Commission on Digital Transformation of National Mapping Agencies
- Commission on Education and Training
- Commission on Ethics in Cartography
- Commission on GeoAI
- Commission on Geospatial Analysis and Modeling
- Commission on Geospatial Data Analytics
- Commission on Geospatial Semantics and Ontology
- Commission on Geovisualization
- Commission on High-Definition Maps
- Commission on Integrated Geospatial Information for Cartography
- Commission on Location Based Services
- Commission on Map Design
- Commission on Map Projections
- Commission on Maps and the Internet
- Commission on Marine Cartography
- Commission on Mountain Cartography
- Commission on Multi-scale Cartography
- Commission on Topographic Mapping
- Commission on Toponymy (ICA-IGU joint commission)
- Commission on Ubiquitous Mapping
- Commission on User Experience

== Working groups ==
- Working Group on the Cartographic Body of Knowledge
- Working Group on Inclusive Cartography
- Working Group Next Generation Cartographers
- Working Group on Participatory Mapping
- Working Group on Peace and Conflict Cartography
- Working Group on Standardisation in Cartography

== Members ==
ICA allows two types of memberships:

- Affiliate members are organisations, institutions or companies wishing to support the mission and activities of ICA.
- National members are national organizations dealing with cartography or geoinformation, such as national mapping agencies.
List of ICA national members
- Algeria: Institut National de Cartographie et de Télédétection
- Argentina: Instituto Geográfico Nacional
- Australia: Mapping Sciences Institute
- Austria: Austrian Cartographic Commission
- Belgium: Belgian Sub-Committee of Cartography and GIS
- Benin: Association Béninoise de Cartographie et de l'Information Géographique
- Botswana: Department of Surveys and Mapping
- Brazil: Sociedade Brasileira de Cartografia
- Bulgaria: Bulgarian Cartographic Association
- Canada: Canadian Institute of Geomatics
- Chile: Instituto Geográfico Militar
- China: Chinese Society of Geodesy, Photogrammetry and Cartography
- China, Hong Kong Special Administrative Region: Hong Kong Committee for ICA
- Colombia: Instituto Geográfico Agustín Codazzi
- Croatia: Croatian Cartographic Society
- Cuba: Grupo Empresial GeoCuba
- Cyprus: Department of Lands and Surveys
- Czech Republic: Czech Cartographic Society
- Denmark: Geoforum Danmark
- Ecuador: Instituto Geografico Militar
- Estonia: Estonian Geoinformatics Society
- Finland: Cartographic Society of Finland
- France: Comité Français de Cartographie
- Georgia: Department of Geography, Tbilisi State University
- Germany: Deutsche Gesellschaft für Kartographie
- Greece: Hellenic Cartographic Society
- Hungary: Hungarian Society of Surveying, Mapping and Remote Sensing
- India: Survey of India
- Indonesia: Bakosurtanal
- Iran: National Cartographic Center
- Ireland: Ordnance Survey Ireland
- Israel: Israeli Society for Cartography and GIS
- Italy: Associazione Italiana di Cartografia
- Japan: National Committee for Cartography
- Jordan: Royal Jordanian Geographic Centre
- Kazakhstan: Uzbekov Umirzak
- Kenya: Survey of Kenya
- Korea: Korean Cartographic Association
- Latvia: Latvian Geospatial Information Agency
- Lithuania: Lithuanian Cartographic Society
- Macedonia: Agency of Real Estate Cadastre
- Madagascar: Foiben-Taosarintanin'i Madagasikara
- Malaysia: Department of Surveying and Mapping
- Mexico: National Institute of Statistics and Geography (INEGI)
- Mongolia: Administration of Land affairs, Geodesy and Cartography
- Montenegro: Association of Geodesists of Montenegro, Branch of Cartography
- Morocco: Agence Nationale de la Conservation Foncière, du Cadastre et de la Cartographie
- Mozambique: Centro Nacional de Cartografia e Teledetecção (CENACARTA)
- Netherlands: Geo-Informatie Nederland
- New Zealand: New Zealand Cartographic Society Inc
- Nigeria: Nigerian Cartographic Association
- Norway: GeoForum
- Pakistan: Survey of Pakistan
- Poland: Instytut Geodezji i Kartografii
- Portugal: Directorate-General for Territorial Development
- Romania: Asociația Română de Cartografie / geo-spatial.org
- Russia: Federal Service for State Registration, Cadastre and Cartography (Rosreestr)
- Serbia: Serbian Association of Cartographers
- Slovakia: Cartographic Society of the Slovak Republic
- Slovenia: Faculty of Civil and Geodetic Engineering
- South Africa: South African National Committee for the ICA
- Spain: Sociedad Española de Cartografía, Fotogrametría y Teledetección
- Sri Lanka: Sri Lanka Survey Department
- Sweden: Kartografiska Sällskapet
- Switzerland: Swiss Society of Cartography
- Tanzania: Cartographic Association of Tanzania
- Thailand: Royal Thai Survey Department
- Trinidad and Tobago: Ministry of Land and Marine Resources
- Turkey: Harita Genel Komutanligi
- Ukraine: State Service of Ukraine for Geodesy, Cartography and Cadastre
- United Kingdom of Great Britain and Northern Ireland: British Cartographic Society
- U.S.: U.S. National Committee for ICA
- Uruguay: Servicio Geográfico Militar

== Conferences ==
International Cartographic Conferences (ICC) take place every second year in one of the member countries. At every second conference (every fourth year) it hosts the General Assembly of the ICA.

=== ICC Conferences ===
- 2025: Vancouver, Canada
- 2023: Cape Town, South Africa
- 2021: Florence, Italy
- 2019: Tokyo, Japan
- 2017: Washington D.C., United States
- 2015: Rio de Janeiro, Brazil
- 2013: Dresden, Germany
- 2011: Paris, France
- 2009: Santiago de Chile, Chile
- 2007: Moscow, Russia
- 2005: A Coruña, Spain
- 2003: Durban, South Africa
- 2001: Beijing, China
- 1999: Ottawa, Canada
- 1997: Stockholm, Sweden
- 1995: Barcelona, Spain
- 1993: Cologne, Germany
- 1991: Bournemouth, United Kingdom
- 1989: Budapest, Hungary
- 1987: Morelia, Mexico
- 1984: Perth, Australia
- 1982: Warsaw, Poland
- 1980: Tokyo, Japan
- 1978: College Park (Maryland), United States
- 1976: Moscow, Soviet Union
- 1974: Madrid, Spain
- 1972: Ottawa, Canada
- 1970: Stresa, Italy
- 1968: Delhi, India
- 1967: Amsterdam, Netherlands
- 1964: Edinburgh, United Kingdom
- 1962: Frankfurt am Main, West Germany
- 1961: Paris, France

== Awards ==
=== Carl Mannerfelt Gold Medal ===
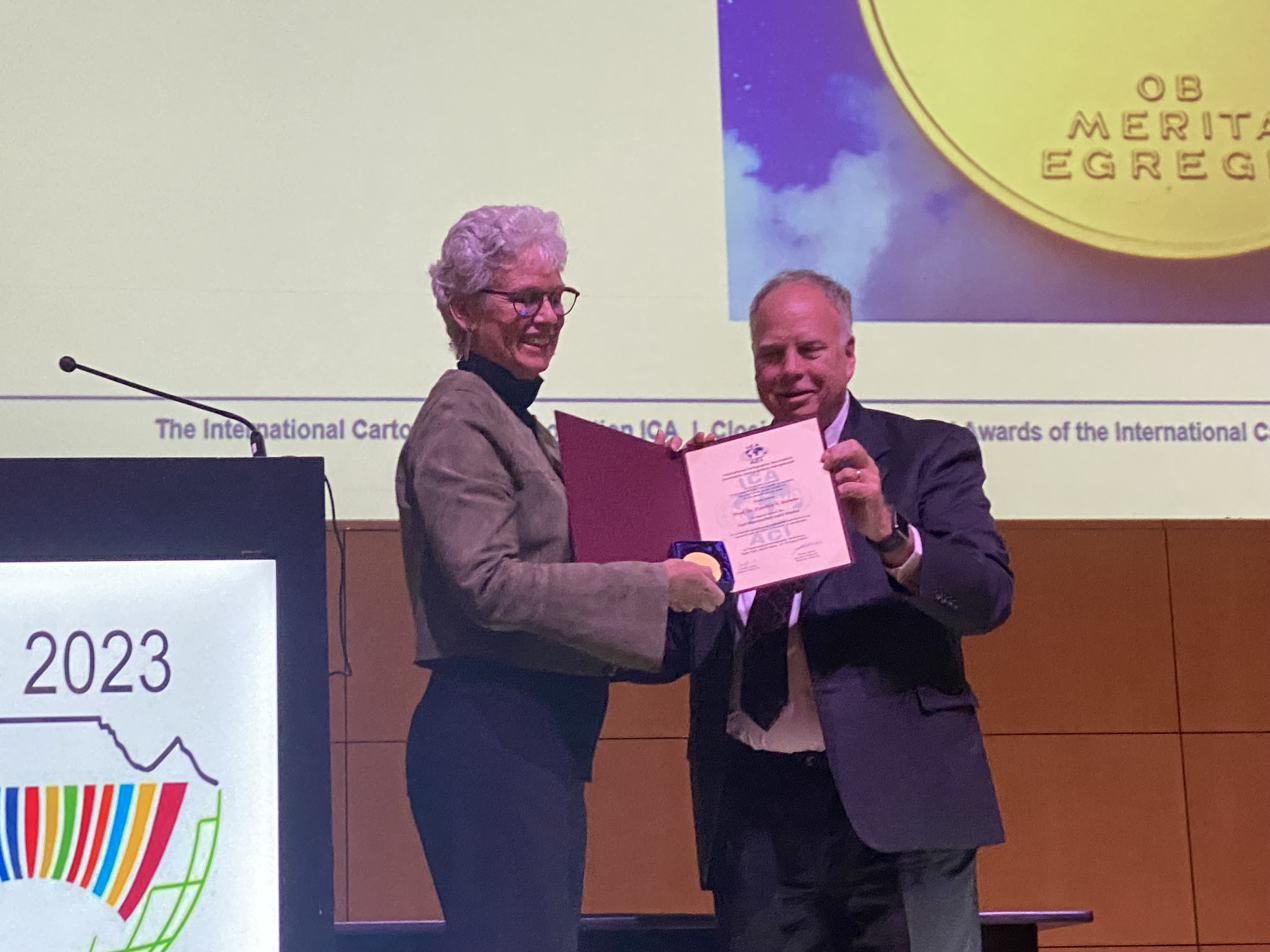
Cynthia Brewer

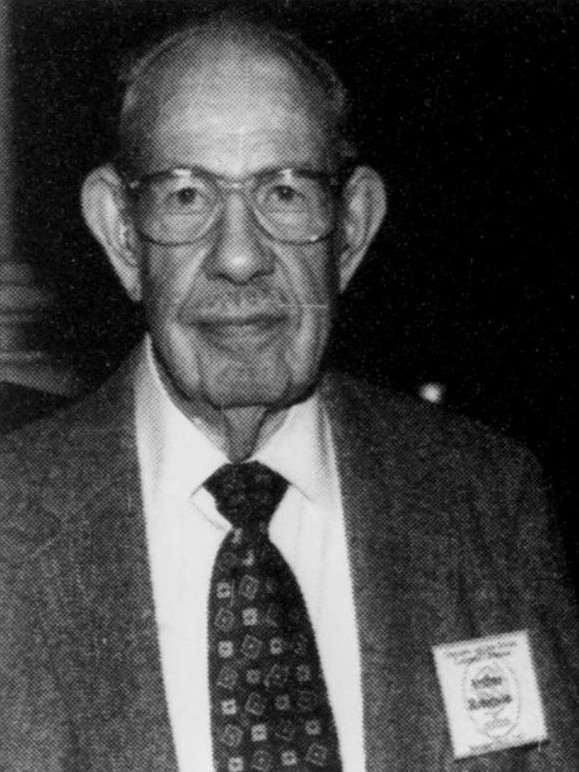
Arthur H. Robinson

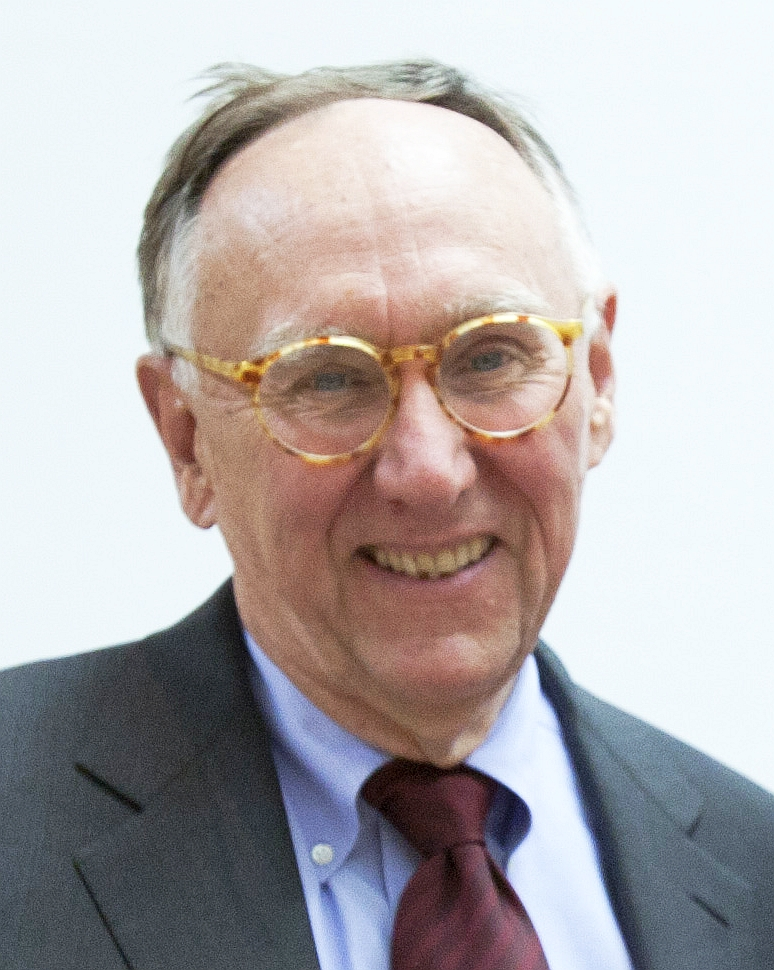
Jack Dangermond

The Carl Mannerfelt Gold Medal honours cartographers of outstanding merit who have made significant contributions of an original nature to the field of cartography. It is awarded only on rare occasions. The award is named after the Swedish cartographer, Carl Mannerfelt, who in 1981 won the prize named after him.

Recipients

Name	Nationality	Year
Cynthia Brewer	United States	2023
D. R. Fraser Taylor	Canada	2013
Ferjan Ormeling Jr.	The Netherlands	2009
Jack Dangermond	United States of America	2007
David Rhind	United Kingdom	2005
Ernst Spiess	Switzerland	2005
Chen Shupeng	China	2001
Joel L. Morrison	United States of America	2001
Jacques Bertin	France	1999
Ferdinand Jan Ormeling Sr.	The Netherlands	1987
Carl Mannerfelt	Sweden	1981
Arthur H. Robinson	United States of America	1980
Konstantin A. Salichtchev	Soviet Union	1980
Eduard Imhof	Switzerland	1979–1980

=== ICA Honorary Fellowship ===
The ICA Honorary Fellowship is for cartographers of international reputation who have made special contribution to the ICA. It includes a bronze medal.

=== ICA Map Awards at the International Map Exhibition ===
At the biennial International Map Exhibitions at the ICC an international jury selects the best entries.

=== Barbara Petchenik International Children Map Design Competition ===
This competition is organized every two years at the ICC. In a national round in all participating ICA member countries, the national winners are selected, which are exhibited during the International Cartographic Conference, where the international winners are selected.

== Publications ==
ICA offers a number of publications. Its official journal is the International Journal of Cartography (print ISSN 2372-9333; online ISSN 2372-9341), published by Taylor & Francis on behalf of ICA. It also has three affiliated journals:

- The Cartographic Journal
- Cartographica
- Cartography and Geographic Information Science

== See also ==
- Commission on Maps and the Internet
- List of geography awards
