= Tomasz Urbanowicz =

Polish architect and artistic architectural glass artist

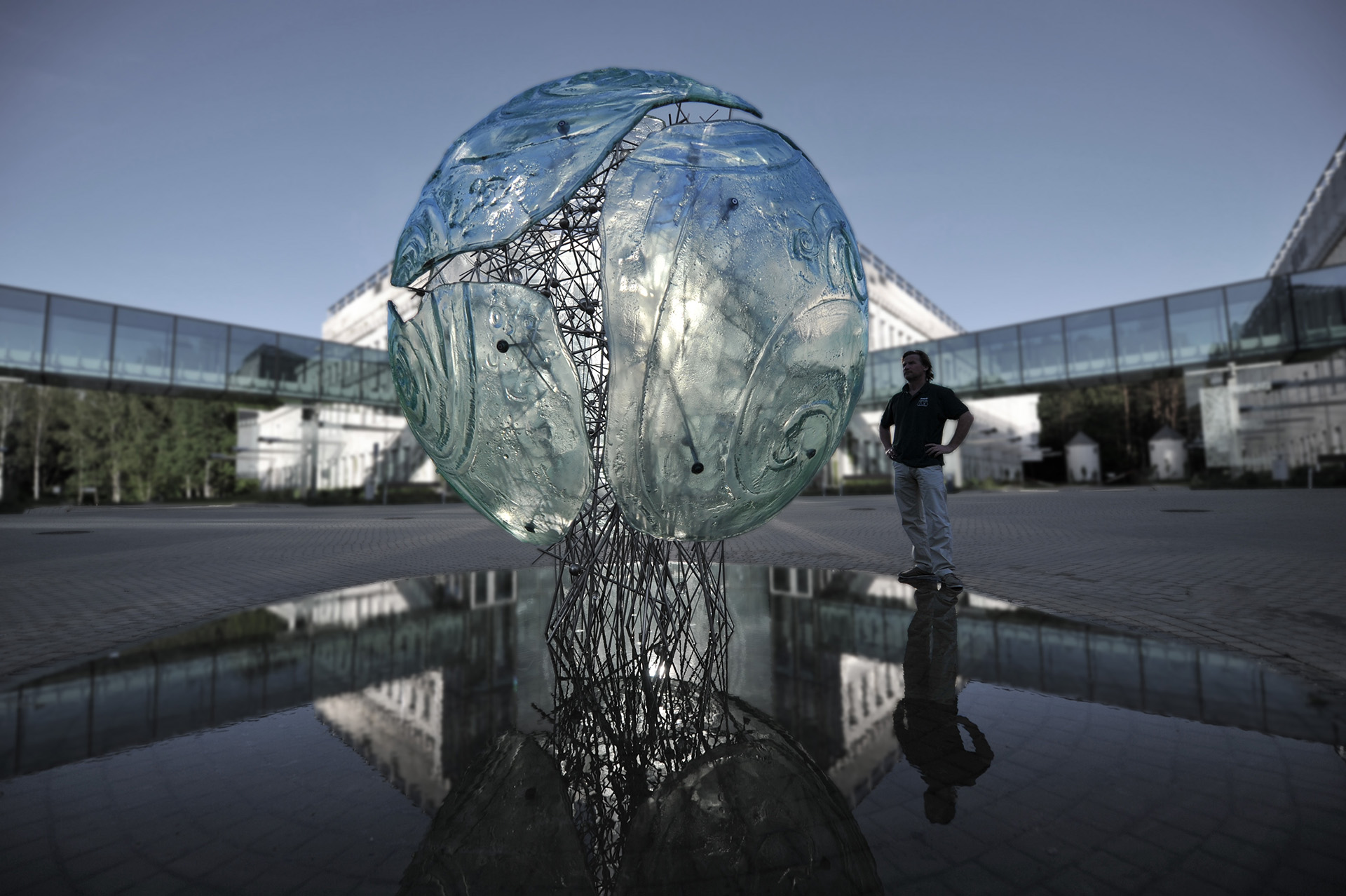
- Tomasz Urbanowicz next to the glass sculpture "Big Bang" at the Campus of the University in Białystok (2015)
- Born: April 14, 1959 (age 67); Wrocław
- Education: Wrocław University of Science and Technology
- Known for: Glass artist

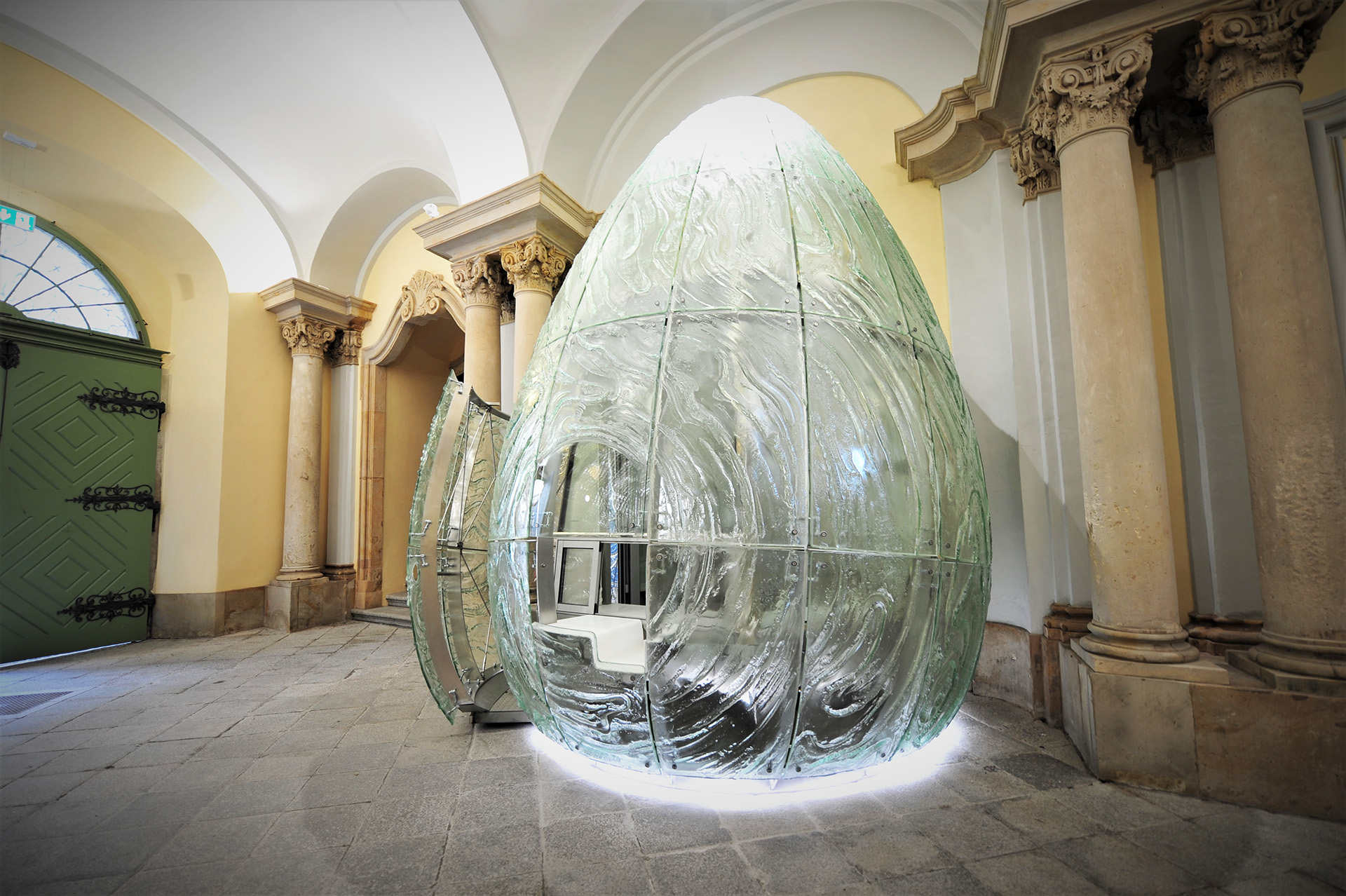
Glass Art EGG, University of Wrocław (2019)

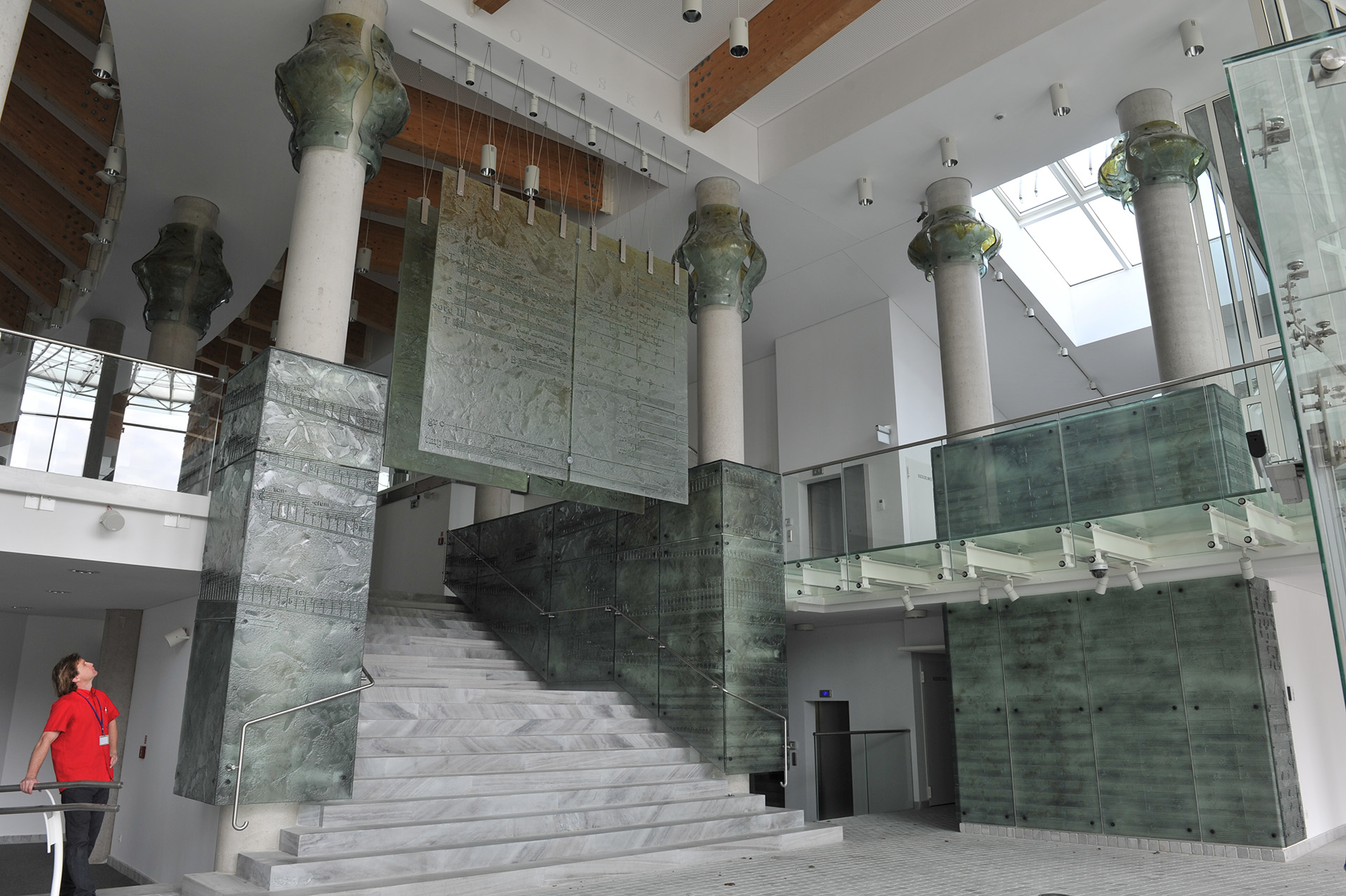
Glass Compositions, Podlaskie Opera and Philharmonic, Białystok (2012)

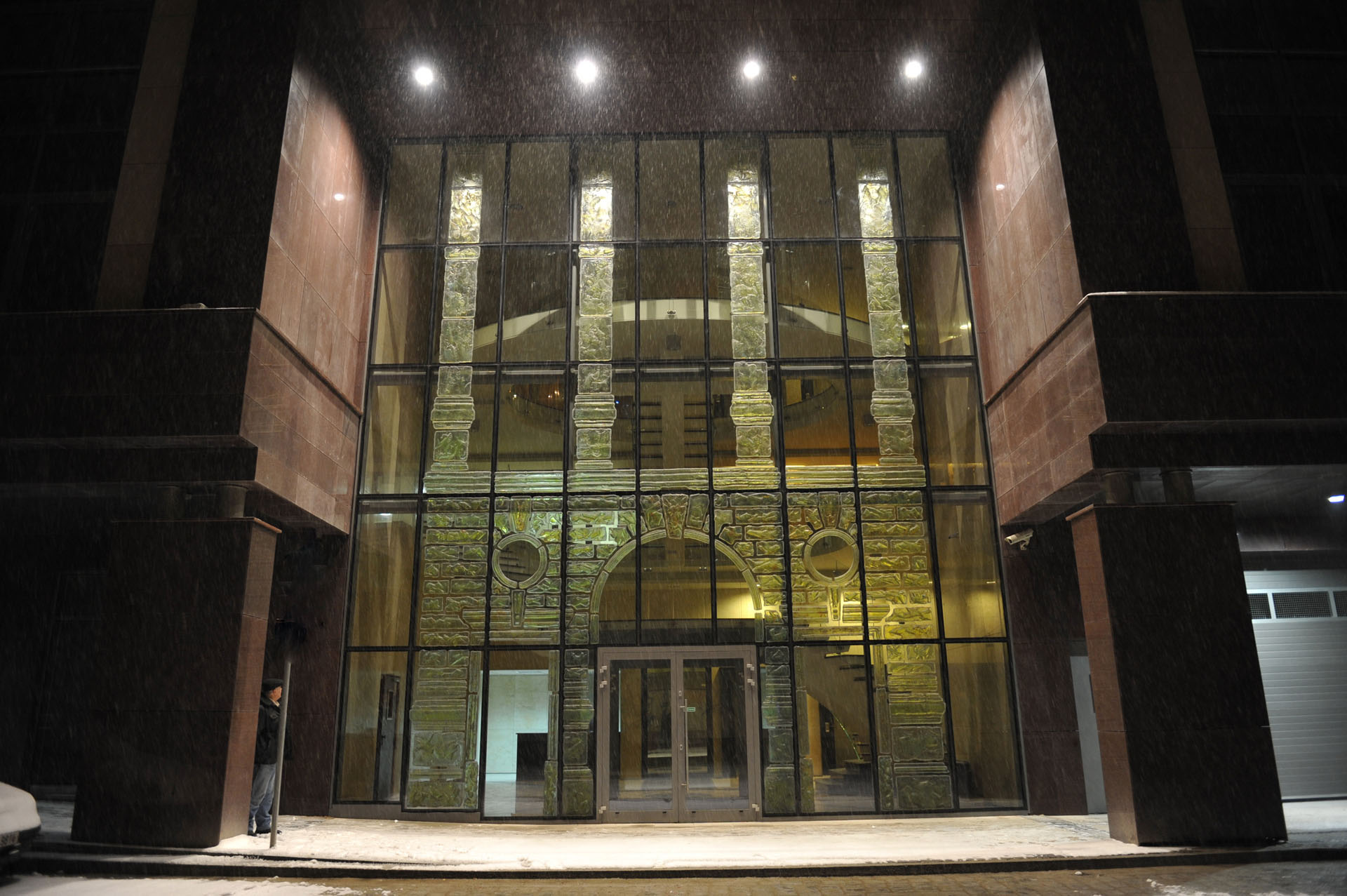
Glass Facade, Justin Center, Wrocław (2010)

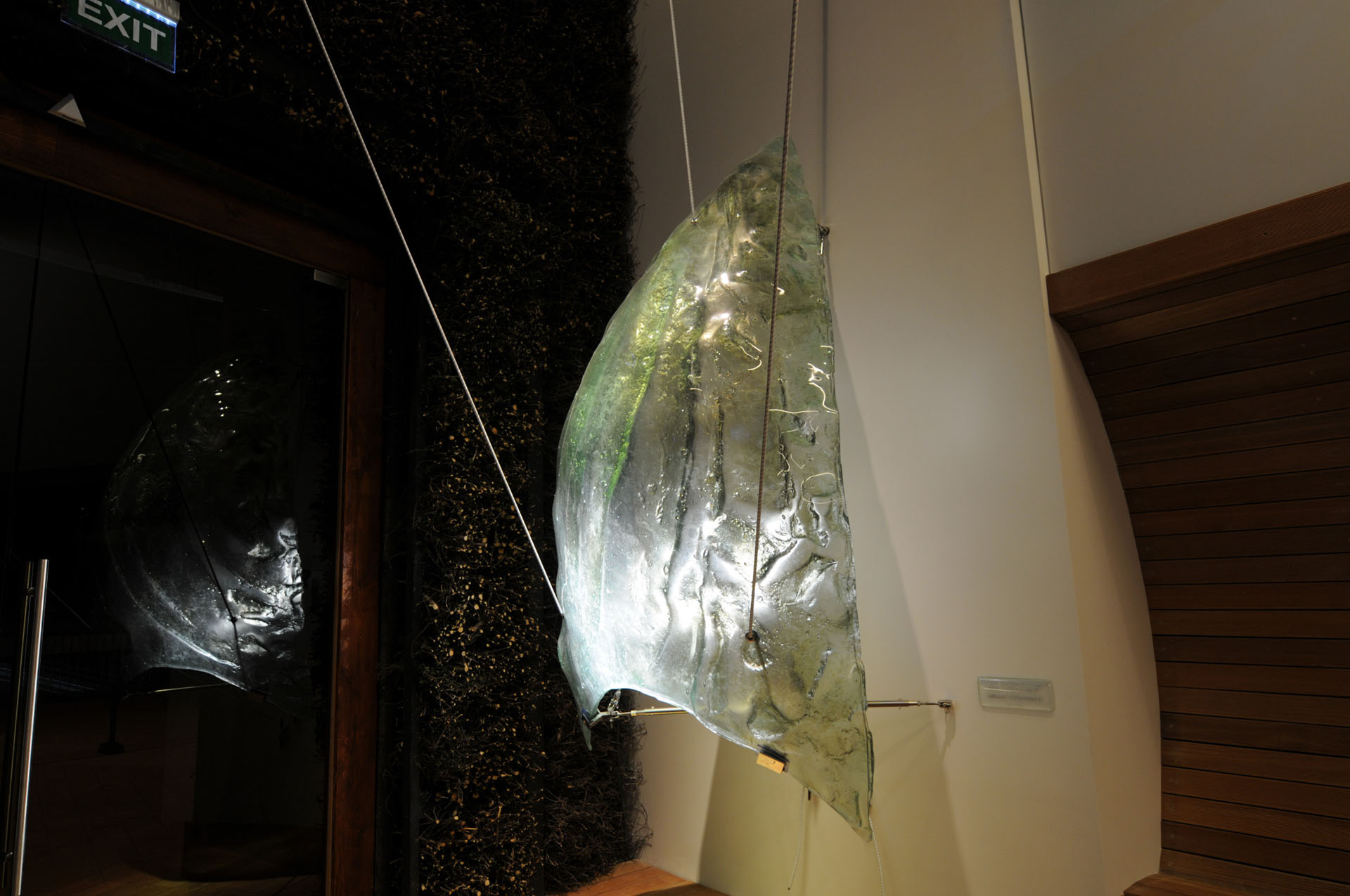
"Wind in the Sails", EXPO 2008 Zaragoza, Spain (2008)

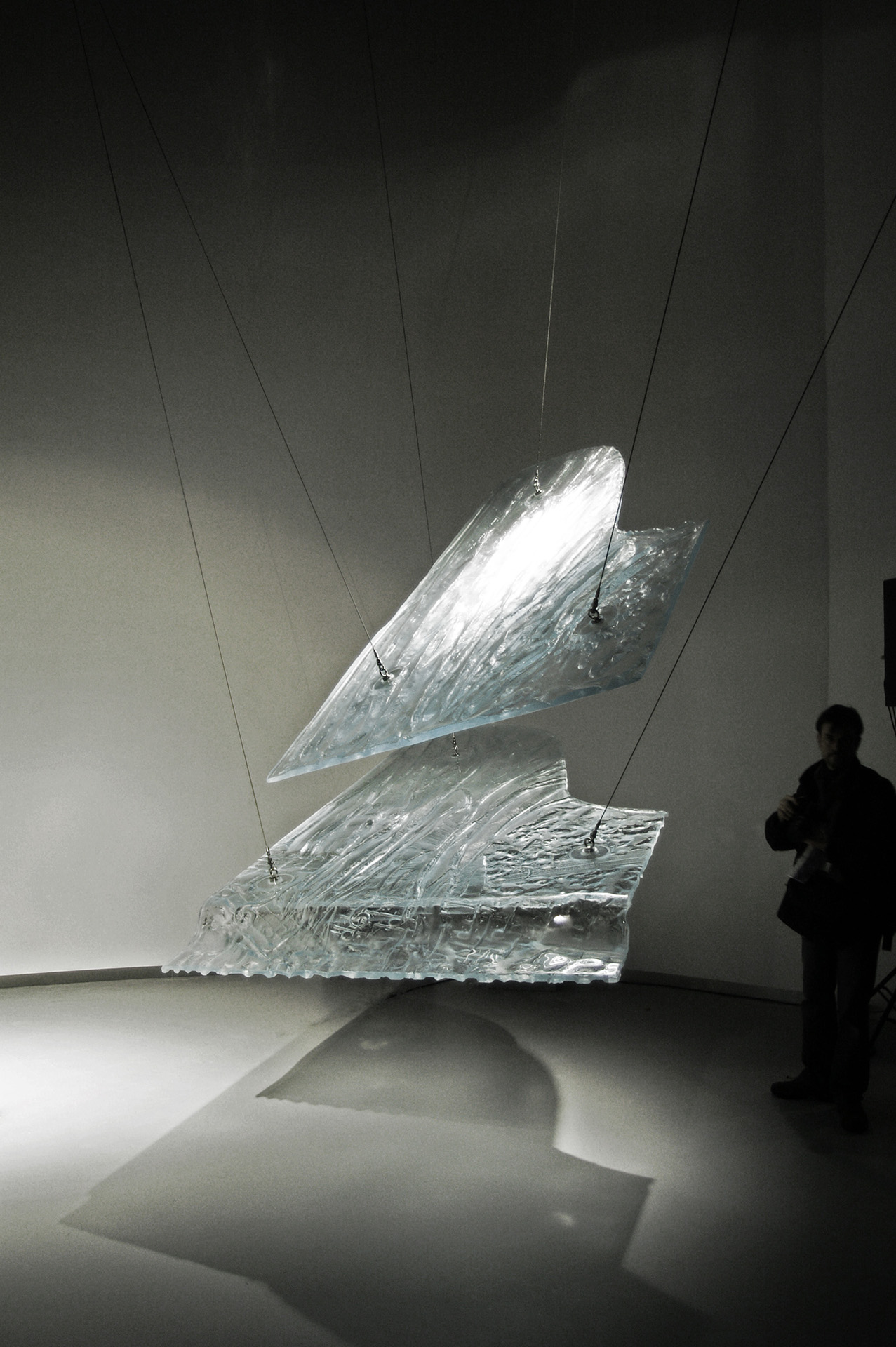
"The Spirit of the Piano", EXPO 2005 Aichi, Japan (2005)

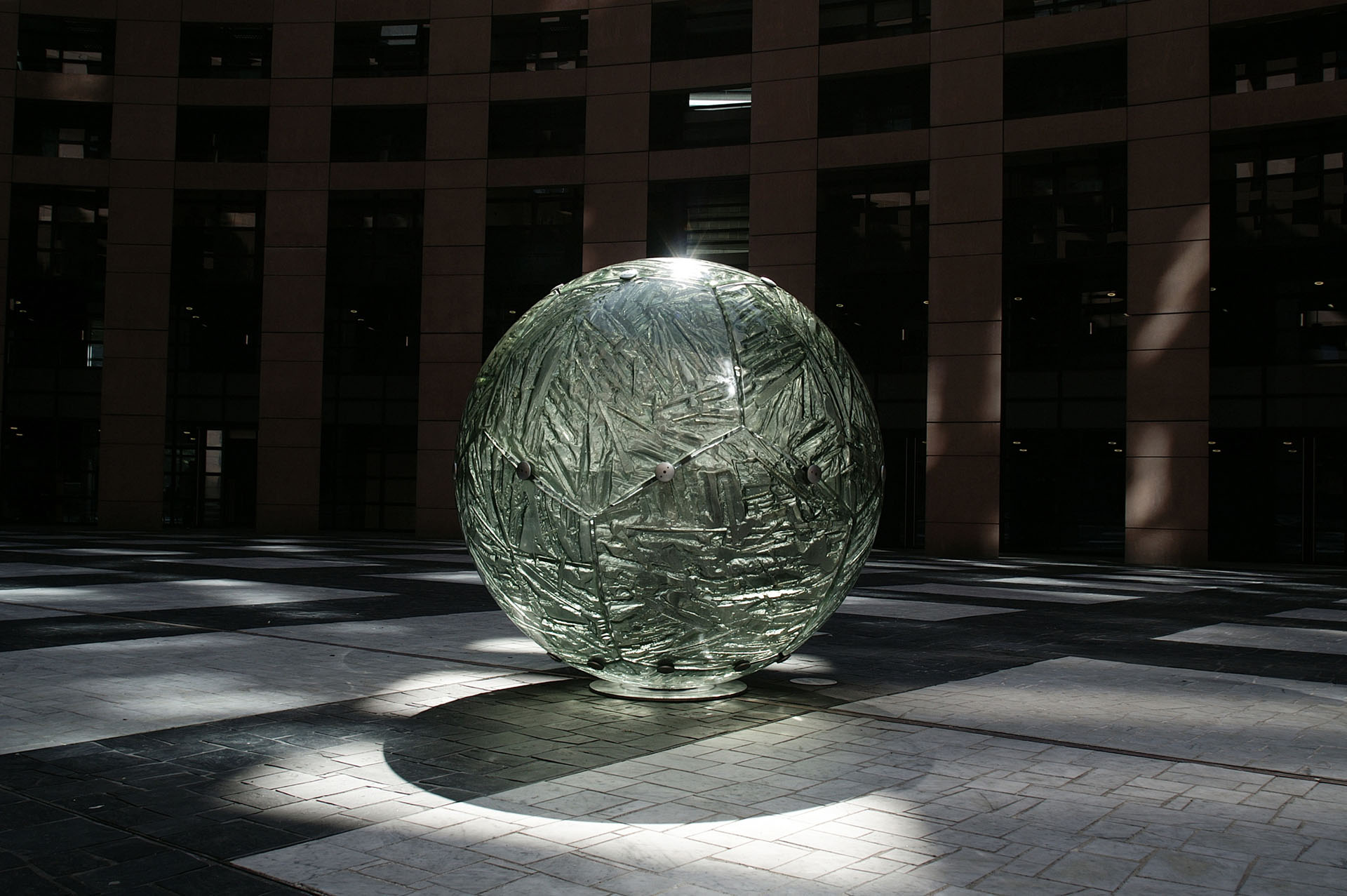
"United Earth", European Parliament, Strasbourg, France (2004)

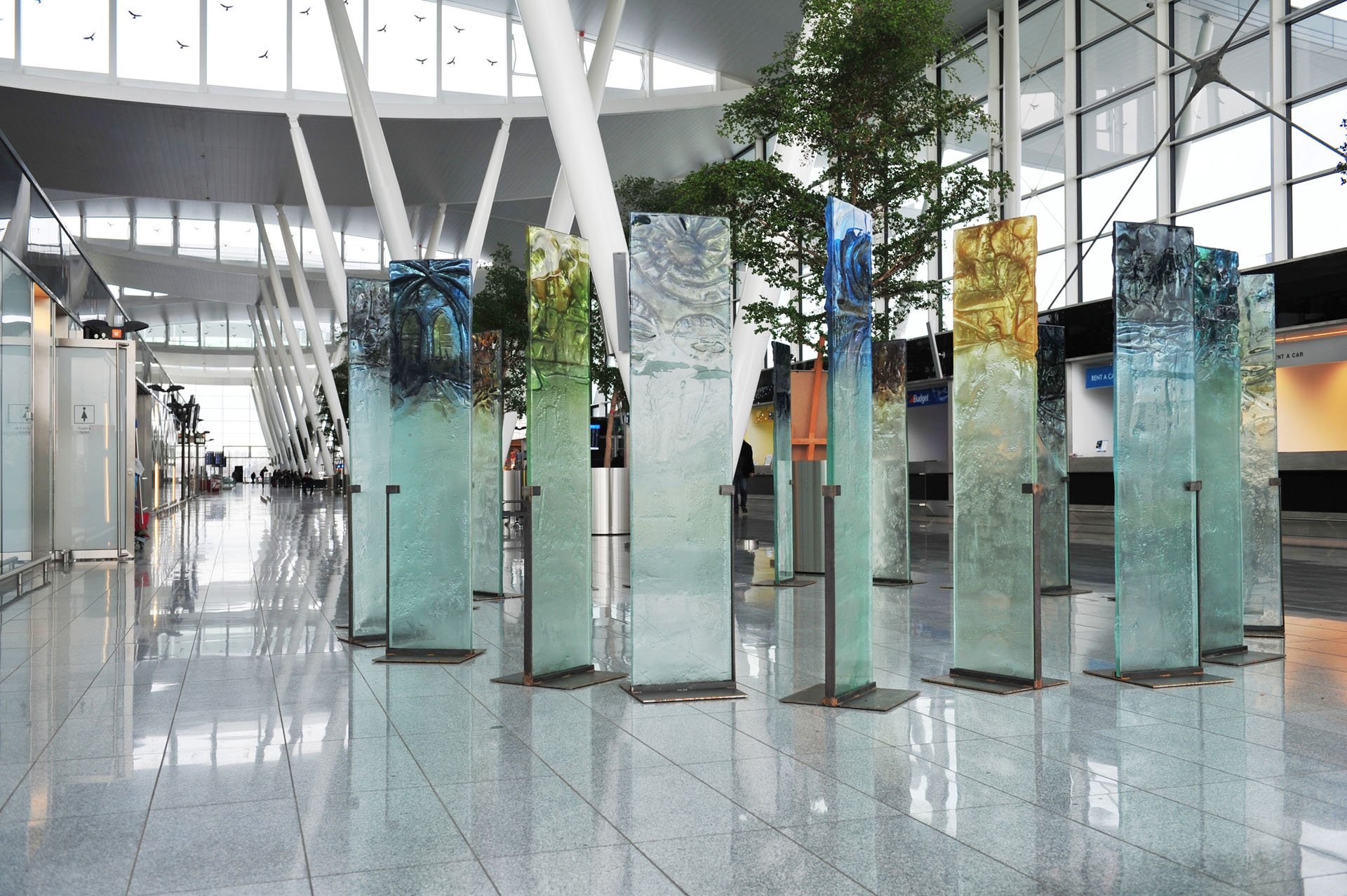
GlassHenge Exhibition, Wrocław Airport (2013/14)

Tomasz Urbanowicz (born 1959 in Wrocław, Poland) is an architect and a designer of architectural glass art.

== Biography ==
Tomasz Urbanowicz graduated at the Faculty of Architecture of the Wrocław University of Technology (1978–85). He took glass-window studies at the Fine Arts Academy of Nicolaus Copernicus University in Toruń, Poland (1982–85) and worked as an assistant in the Painting and Sculpture Establishment at the Architecture Department of Wrocław Institute. In 1987, together with his wife, architect Beata Urbanowicz, he established his own studio, Archiglass, focused on creating architectural glass art. In 2016, Tomasz Urbanowicz was awarded the Honorable Graduate Award by Wrocław University of Technology.

His glassworks were featured in 'Colours of Architecture' by Andrew Moor (London, 2006), 'Contemporary Kiln-formed Glass' by Keith Cummings ( London / Philadelphia 2009) and 'Szkło we Współczesnej Architekturze' by Ewa Wala.

Urbanowicz's artworks took part in World Fairs EXPO three times representing Poland; at EXPO 2000 in Hanover, Germany - as part of the presentation of Lower Silesia; at EXPO 2005 in Aichi, Japan, where his glass composition ‘the Soul of the Piano’ was the main artefact in the Polish Pavilion, designed by prof. Krzysztof Ingarden, and at EXPO 2008 in Zaragoza, Spain, where his composition ‘Poland - Wind in the Sails’ was part of the national presentation.

Architectural glass art composition by Tomasz Urbanowicz can also be found in many places around the world: the glass orb ‘The United Earth’ is a central artistic element on European Parliament building agora in Strasbourg, France; the glass rainbow ‘Larc en ciel’ decorates G. Brassens College in Paris, France; green glass castings enlight the lobby of the Holsten Brewery Headquarters in Hamburg, Germany; and the composition ‘Blue Sunset in the Ocean’ cruises around the world on one of the world's biggest ocean liners Queen Mary 2.

One of the artist's works is a complex architectural glass composition with diverse musical notations in the foyer of the newly built Podlaskie Opera and Philharmonic building in Białystok, Poland.

In 2014, Urbanowicz's glass art works from the 'GlassHenge' series were exhibited at the Wrocław Airport.

In the years 2018-2019 Tomasz Urbanowicz together with prof. Przemysław Tyszkiewicz developed a new own technique to consolidate graphics in glass art. They created several joint works called 'Corsydians' series, exhibited among others at the collective exhibition "Para.Ceramics.Prints' in Oblastni galerie in Liberec or the collective exhibition "Robinson's Ship" organized by the City Gallery and Museum of Architecture in Wrocław.

The latest realizations of large-scale architectural glass art, made by Tomasz Urbanowicz in cooperation with his son, arch. Konrad Urbanowicz, include the composition "The Spirit of Health" at the Integrative Medical Center Clinic in Żerniki Wrocławskie and the glass art EGG - concierge desk in the baroque interior of the historic Main Building of the University of Wrocław.

== Selected projects ==
- 2019 - Glass Art EGG, Concierge Desk, Main Building, University of Wrocław
- 2018 - 'The Spirit of Health', Glass Compositions, IMC Integrative Medical Center Clinic, Żerniki Wrocławskie
- 2015 - Artistic Glass Panels in Main Hall and Chapel, T. Marciniak Lower Silesian Specialist Hospital, Wrocław
- 2015 - Glass Waterfalls Facade, Ultranet Office Building, Wrocław
- 2015 - Artistic Glasing, Senate Hall, University of Economics in Katowice
- 2014 - Artistic Glass Balustrade, 'ODRA' European Cooperation Center, Oława
- 2013 - Glass Sculpture 'Big Bang', Campus of the University in Białystok
- 2012 - Architectural Glass Art – columns, capitals, walls, panels - interior & exterior, Podlaskie Opera and Philharmonic, Białystok
- 2011 - 'Baroque glasses', Main Building, University of Wrocław
- 2011 - Glass & Stone Compositions, Muzeum Karkonoskie, Jelenia Góra
- 2010 - 'Silver Meteorites', Glass & Stone Compositions, Optical fiber backlit, Swimming Pool, Srebrna Góra
- 2010 - 'Catamaran Sails', Glass Compositions, Optical fiber backlit, Swimming Pool in 'Catamaran House', Chyby
- 2010 - Artistic Glass Panels, Słoneczne Termy, Wielka Pieniawa, Polanica Zdrój
- 2010 - First Psalm on Curved Artistic Glasses, Church St. Józef, Przedbórz
- 2010 - Glass Facade, Justin Center, Wrocław
- 2010 - Architectural Glass Art Panels, Restaurant 'Pod Złotym Głogiem', Market Square, Głogów
- 2008 - Glass Sculpture 'Wind in the Sails', EXPO 2008 Zaragoza, Spain
- 2008 - 'Kudowater', A three-story-high Glass Art Composition, Sanatorium 'Zameczek', Kudowa Zdrój
- 2008 - Architectural Glass Art Panels, Centuria Wellness & Spa Hotel, Ogrodzieniec
- 2008 - Glass Art Cross and Artistic Glasing, Church of the Savior of the Evangelical-Augsburg Parish, Działdowo
- 2008 - Parisian Motifs in Glass Art Panels, 'Bistro de Paris' Restaurant, Warsaw
- 2006 - 'Angel', Polish Institute in Prague, Czech Republic
- 2006 - Electric Glass Art Compositions, Science and Research Center, Faculty of Electrical Engineering, Wrocław University of Science and Technology
- 2005 - Glass Sculpture 'The Soul of the Piano', EXPO 2005 Aichi, Japan
- 2004 - Artistic Glass Panels, university's Chapel, Faculty of Theology, University of Silesia in Katowice
- 2004 - Glass Sphere 'United Earth', European Parliament, Strasbourg, France
- 2003 - Curved Glass Composition 'Blue Sunset in the Ocean', 10th Deck, Transatlantic RMS Queen Mary II
- 2001 - Featured Glass Wall Composition, Museum of Architecture, Wrocław
- 2000 - Architectural Glass Art, The Palace in Opypy
- 2000 - Glass Compositions 'Brewing Process', Holsten Brewery, Hamburg, Germany
- 2000 - 'Bear', Glass Sculpture, EXPO 2000 Hanover, Germany
- 2000 - Glass & Brass Portal, 'Under the Blue Sun' Passage, Rynek, Wrocław
- 1999 - Glass Eagle Compositions, Supreme Court, Warsaw
- 1999 - 'Hope', Glass Art Cross, Evangelical-Augsburg Parish of God's Providence, Wrocław
- 1996 - Silver-inspired Glass Composition, 'Muse' Cultural Center, Lubin
- 1995 - Glass Rainbow Sculpture, Bank Pekao S.A., Lubin
- 1993 - Glass Rainbow Composition, Collège Georges-Brassens, Paris, France

== Selected national and international exhibitions ==
- 2019 - 'Robinsons's Ship', Collective Exhibition, The City Gallery and Museum of Architecture, Wrocław
- 2018-2019 - 'Para.Ceramics.Graphics', The Eugeniusz Geppert Academy of Arts and Design Collective Exhibition (host/guest), Oblastni Galerie, Liberec, Czech Republic
- 2018 - 'Long Night of Museums', Archiglass Gallery 'Szopa Jazowa', Wrocław
- 2017-2018 - „Glasstosteron”, Collective Exhibition (Andrzej Kucharski, Marcin Litwa, Mariusz Łabiński, Wojciech Olech, Kazimierz Pawlak, Wojciech Peszko, Janusz Robaszewski, Czesław Roszkowski, Stanisław Sobota, Grzegorz Staniszewski, Tomasz Urbanowicz, Ryszard Więckowski, Igor Wójcik, Maciej Zaborski)
  - Książ Castle, March - April 2017
  - The City Art Gallery, Łódź, April – May 2017
  - Glass Heritage Centre, Krosno, June – August 2017
  - Glass and Ceramics Cenre, Cracow, September – November 2017
  - WINDA Gallery of Contemporary Art, Kielce, January – February 2018
- 2016 - 'Glass and Ceramics - Sensual Areas', European Capital of Culture, City Arsenal, Wrocław
- 2016 - Glaskunst Exhibition, Cannenburgh Castle, Vaassen, Netherlands
- 2016 - Festival dell' Arte, Wojanów Palace
- 2014 - 'Painted with Glass', Contemporary Arts Gallery, Ostrów Wielkopolski
- 2014 - 'GlassHenge', Wrocław Airport
- 2014 - Festival dell' Arte, Pakoszów Palace
- 2013 - Festival dell' Arte, Wojanów Palace
- 2013 - Glaskunst Exhibition, Cannenburgh Castle, Vaassen, Netherlands
- 2012 - Festival dell' Arte, Wojanów Palace
- 2008 - EXPO Zaragoza, Glass Sculpture 'Wind in the Sails' in the Polish Pavilion, Spain
- 2006 - 'Tomasz Urbanowicz, Szkło | Glass', The City Gallery 'Arsenal', Poznań
- 2005 - EXPO 2005 Aichi, Glass Sculpture 'The Soul of the Piano' in the Polish Pavilion, Japan,
- 2003 - Polish Embassy Gardens, Prague, Czech Republic
- 2000 - EXPO 2000 Hanover, Germany
- 1999 - 'URBANOWICZ-SZKŁO | -GLASS', Museum of Architecture, Wrocław
