= United Earth =

Public artwork by Tomasz Urbanowicz and Beata Urbanowicz

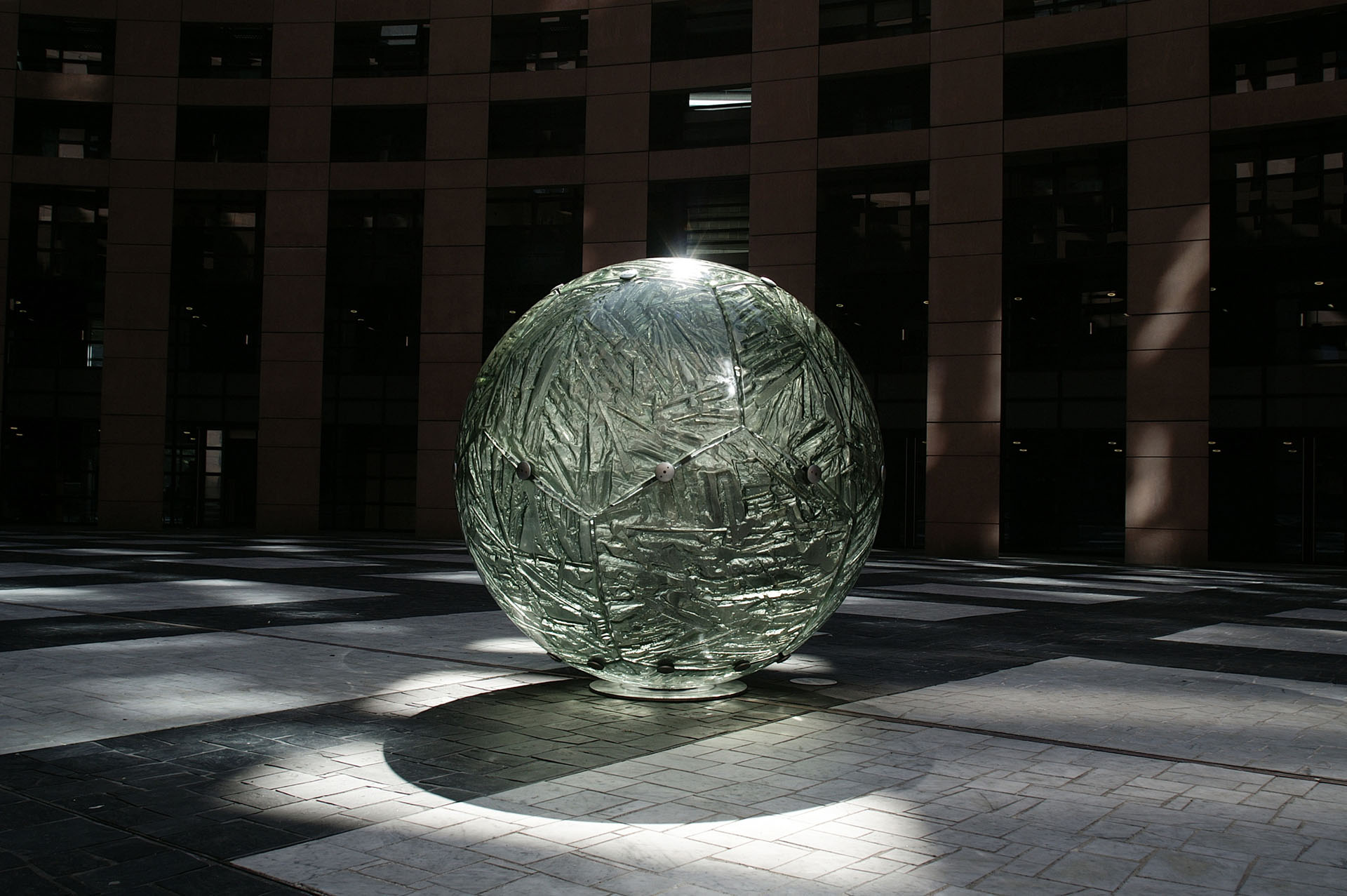
- Glass artwork United Earth in the agora of European Parliament in Strasbourg
- Artist: Tomasz Urbanowicz
- Completion date: 2004
- Type: Sculpture
- Medium: Glass art
- Dimensions: 180 cm diameter (71 in)
- Weight: 700 kg (1,500 lb)
- Location: Strasbourg
- 48.597528°N 7.768556°E
- Owner: European Parliament in Strasbourg

United Earth (Polish: Zjednoczony Świat) is a public artwork by Tomasz Urbanowicz and Beata Urbanowicz in the Agora of the Seat of the European Parliament in Strasbourg. The glass sculpture has a diameter of 180 cm (71 in) and symbolizes the idea of openness to further expansion of the European Union in order to create a united world.

== History ==
The sculpture was first created in 1999 as part of the "Urbanowicz - Glass" exhibition in the Museum of Architecture in Wrocław, which represented the glass art portfolio of Beata and Tomasz Urbanowicz. The artwork represented Poland at the international exhibition EXPO 2000 in Hanover, as part of the regional presentation of Lower Silesia. The glass sphere was recognized by The Corning Museum of Glass in New York as one of the hundred most outstanding glass works in the world in New Glass Review 21. In 2003 the artwork, also called "Archikula", was exhibited at the "Glass Universe" exhibition in the gardens of the Polish Embassy in Prague. The following year sculpture took part in the "ST'ART" art fair in Strasbourg. Since 2004, the glass sphere has been a permanent element of the European Parliament's agora in Strasbourg, after approval by the Louise Weiss building's architects - Architecture-Studio from Paris. The sculpture is a gift from the City of Wrocław to the European Parliament after Poland's accession to the European Union.

== Bibliography ==
- New Glass Review 21, The Corning Museum of Glass, New York, 2000, ISSN 0275-469X
- Durczak M., W Hanowerze, Dolny Śląsk na EXPO 2000, "Region Dolny Śląsk" (8/2000), Stowarzyszenie na Rzecz Promocji Dolnego Śląska, Wrocław, 2000, ISSN 1506-2929
- Maluga L., Formy szklane w przestrzeni architektonicznej (nowe realizacje Urbanowiczów), Archivolta 4/2005, ISSN 1506-5928
- Harasimowicz J., Suleja W.: Encyklopedia Wrocławia, Wydawnictwo Dolnośląskie Sp. z o.o., 2006, ISBN 978-83-7384-561-9
- Cummings, K., Contemporary Kiln-formed Glass, London | Philadelphia, A & C Black Publishers Ltd. | University of Pennsylvania Press, 2009, ISBN 978-1-4081-0075-2
- Wala, E., Szkło we współczesnej architekturze, Wydawnictwo Politechniki Śląskiej, Gliwice, 2012, ISBN 978-83-7880-080-4
- Llewellyn D. J., The materials and processes suitable for the production of large scale three dimensional glass as exemplified in the work of Tomasz Urbanowicz, University of Wales Trinity St. David, Swansea, 2016
