= Jonas, Netherlands =

Jonas Hafkamp
- Hamlet
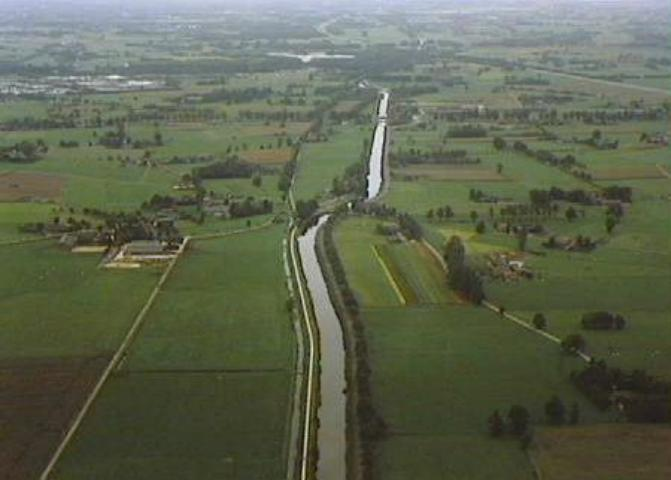
- Aerial photo of the Apeldoornsch Kanaal, with Jonas on the left side (near the bridge)

- Location in the province of Gelderland Jonas (Netherlands)
- Coordinates: 52°17′3″N 5°59′25″E
- Country: Netherlands
- Province: Gelderland
- Municipality: Epe; Apeldoorn
- Elevation: 16 m (52 ft)
- Time zone: UTC+1 (CET)
  - Summer (DST): UTC+2 (CEST)
- Postal code: 7345 & 8171
- Dialing code: 055 & 0578

Jonas (sometimes "De Jonas" or Hafkamp) is a hamlet in the Dutch province of Gelderland. It lies east of the village of Vaassen, on the western side of the Apeldoornsch Kanaal.

Jonas lies on the border of the municipalities Epe and Apeldoorn. Jonas is not a statistical entity, and has been placed by the postal authorities under Wenum-Wiesel and Vaassen. It was first mentioned in 1899 as Jonas (De), and is a house name. Between 1899 and 1918, a dairy factory was located in Jonas. The hamlet consists of about 20 houses.
