= Seat of the European Parliament in Strasbourg =

Meeting place for the EU legislative body

Louise Weiss building
- Immeuble du Parlement Européen IV (IPE 4)
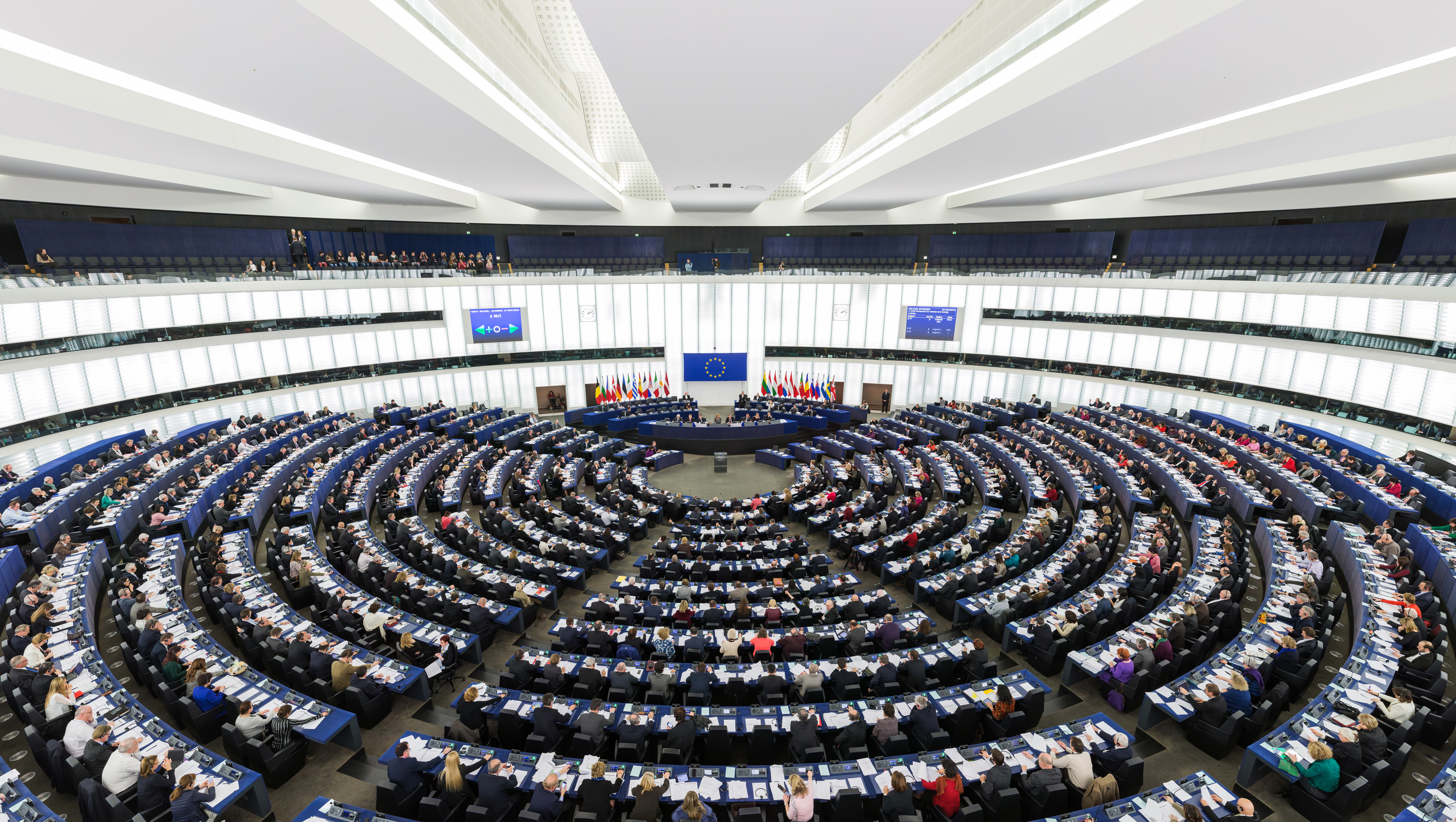
- The Hemicycle inside the Louise Weiss Building

General information
- Type: Debating Chamber and MEP offices
- Architectural style: Contemporary
- Location: Strasbourg, France
- Coordinates: 48.597401°N 7.768825°E
- Completed: 14 December 1999
- Owner: European Union

Height
- Height: 60 m (tower)

Dimensions
- Diameter: 100 m (tower)
- Other dimensions: Hemicycle inside : 56×44×15 m (184×144×49 ft)

Technical details
- Floor count: 20 (17 above-ground levels, 3 sub-ground levels)
- Floor area: 220,000 m^{2} (2,400,000 sq ft)

Design and construction
- Architect: Architecture-Studio
- Main contractor: S.E.R.S.

The city of Strasbourg in France is the official seat of the European Parliament. The institution is legally bound by the decision of Edinburgh European Council of 11 and 12 December 1992 and Article 341 of the TFEU to meet there twelve times a year for a session, each of which usually takes about four days. The majority of work, however, takes place in Brussels, and some other work is undertaken in Luxembourg City (see Location of European Union institutions for more information). Also, all votes of the European Parliament must take place in Strasbourg. "Additional" sessions and committees take place in Brussels. Although de facto a majority of the Parliament's work is now geared to its Brussels site, it is legally bound to keep Strasbourg as its official home; a situation which garners much criticism from the European Parliament itself, as well as many interest groups, administrative staff, and environmentalist groups amongst others.

The Parliament's six buildings, all named after distinguished European politicians, are located in the Quartier Européen (European Quarter) of the city, which it shares with other European organisations which are separate from the European Union. Previously the Parliament used to share the same assembly room as the Council of Europe. Today, the principal building is the Louise Weiss building, inaugurated in 1999 and named after the women's rights activist and former MEP, Louise Weiss.

== Principal building ==
The Louise Weiss building

The Louise Weiss building (IPE 4; named after Louise Weiss, a French former member of the parliament), is located in the Wacken district of Strasbourg, south of Schiltigheim, between the 1920s workers' suburban colony (Cité ouvrière) Cité Ungemach and the 1950s buildings of the Strasbourg fair, some of which had to be torn down to make way for the Immeuble du Parlement européen 4, its formal name. Built at a cost of 3.1 billion French francs (470 million euros) at the intersection of the Ill and the Marne-Rhine Canal, it houses the hemicycle for plenary sessions, the largest of any European institution (750 seats – expanded to 785 – for MEPs and 680 for visitors), 18 other assembly rooms as well as a total of 1,133 parliamentary offices. Through a covered footbridge over the Ill, the Louise Weiss communicates with the Winston Churchill and Salvador de Madariaga buildings.

With its surface of 220,000m² and its distinctive 60m tower, it is one of the biggest and most visible buildings of Strasbourg. The Louise Weiss was designed by the Paris-based team of architects Architecture-Studio. The architects were inspired by Roman amphitheatres. After the project was approved at an international contest in 1991, work, commissioned by the Société d'Aménagement et d'Équipement de la Région de Strasbourg on behalf of the Urban Community of Strasbourg, started in May 1995, with up to twelve tower cranes at the time on what was one of the biggest building sites of the decade in Europe. The inauguration of the building took place on 14 December 1999 by French President Jacques Chirac and Parliament President Nicole Fontaine. In internal EP documents, the building is referred to as "LOW".

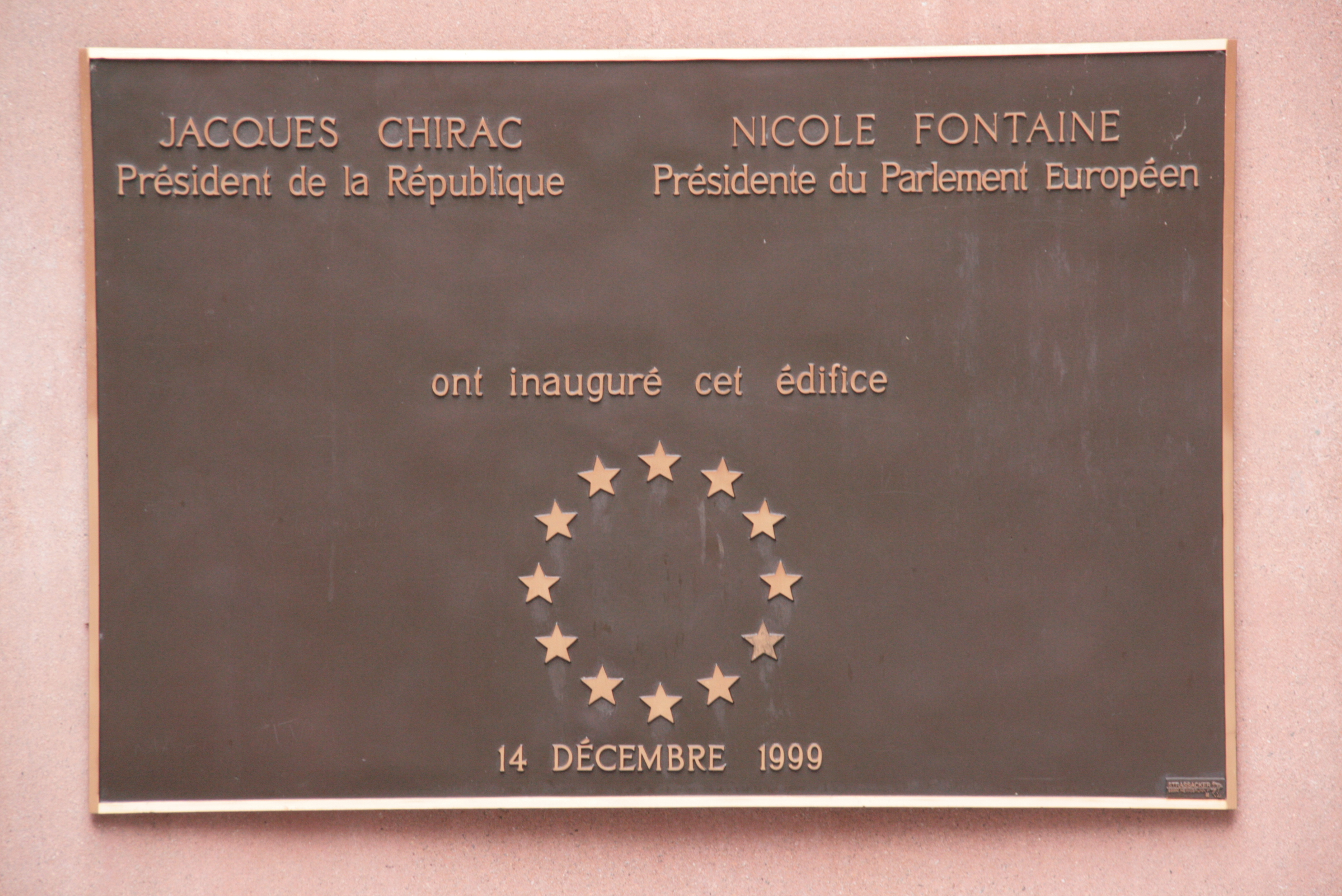
Plaque commemorating the inauguration of the Louise Weiss building of the European Parliament in Strasbourg on 14 December 1999, by President of France, Jacques Chirac, and President of the European Parliament, Nicole Fontaine

=== Tower ===
The 60m high tower, intentionally left unfinished on one side, carries heavy symbolism, and is often said to have been oriented eastwards, i.e. towards eastern Europe, as by the time of the completion of the building no country from the former Soviet bloc had yet joined the EU. However, the open side of the tower actually faces west. In 2010 American conservative commentator Glenn Beck suggested that the tower's design consciously mirrors the Vienna painting of the Tower of Babel by Pieter Bruegel the Elder.

=== Agora ===
On 14 January 2009, the European Parliament decided to bestow the name of Bronisław Geremek, a recently deceased member from Poland, on the courtyard inside the tower, calling it the "Bronisław Geremek Agora" (French: Agora Bronisław Geremek). This was officially inaugurated on 21 April 2009.

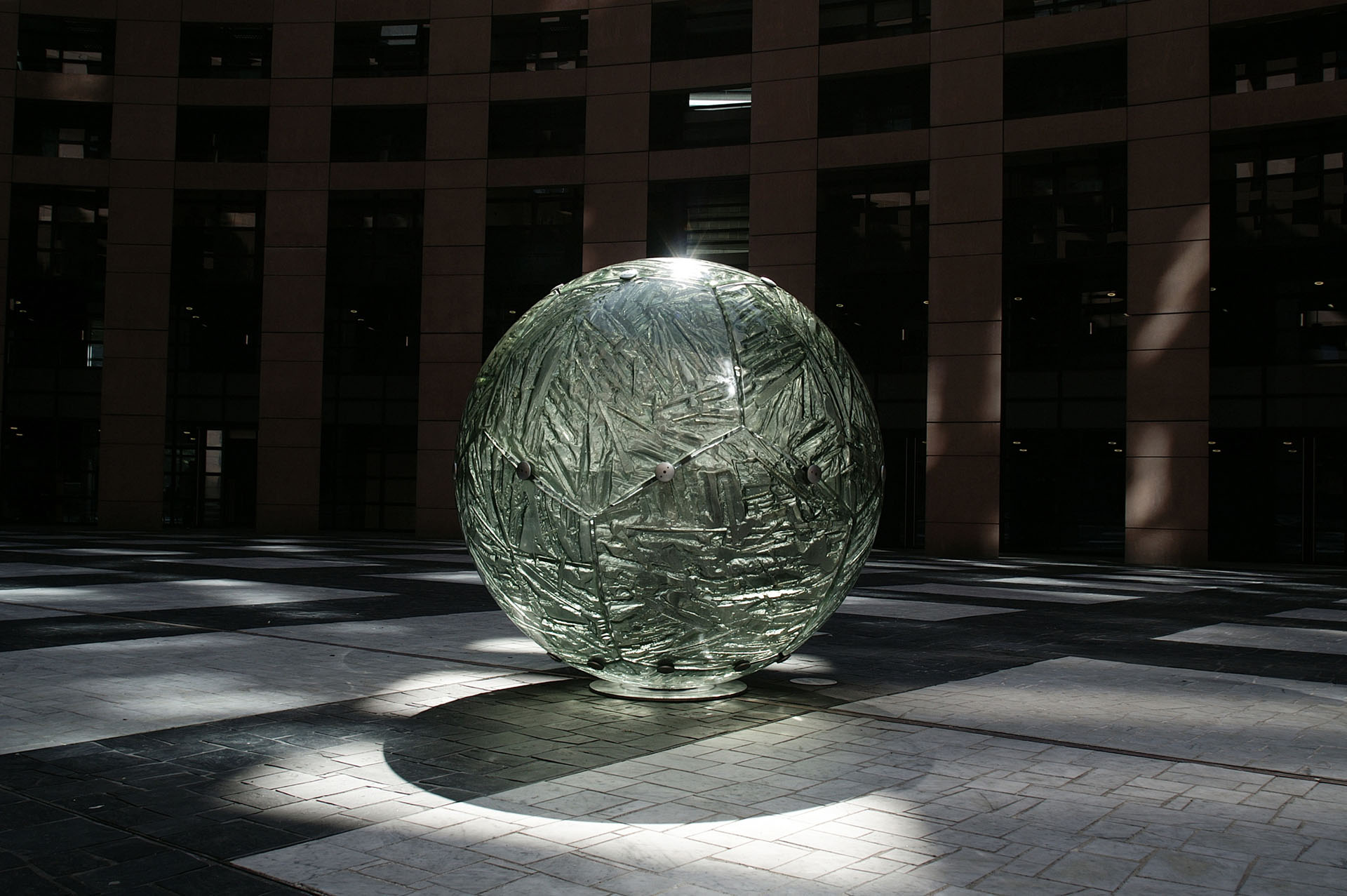
Glass sculpture "United Earth" by Tomasz Urbanowicz, at the Agora of the Louise Weiss Building in Strasbourg

Since 2004, the centre of the Agora is marked with a glass sculpture "United Earth" by artist Tomasz Urbanowicz, which refers to the notion of openness and further expansion of the European Union. The glass artifact was approved by the Architecture-Studio and officially handed over as a gift from the City of Wrocław in the presence of the Josep Borrell, then President of the European Parliament.

=== Hemicycle ===
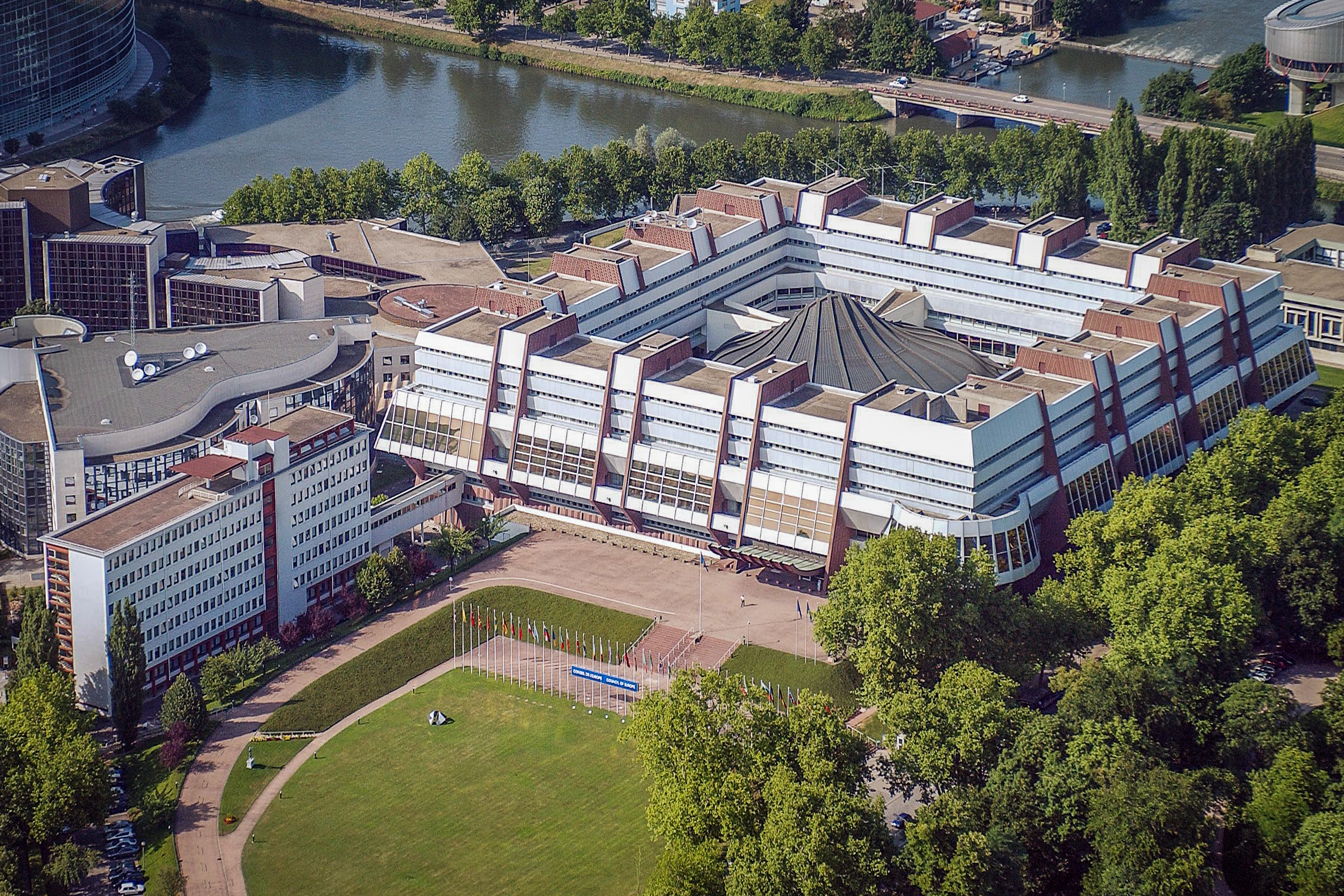
From left to right: Louise Weiss, Winston Churchill, Pierre Pflimlin, Václav Havel (before the transformation, photo taken in 2008), and Council of Europe buildings

Members sit in a hemicycle according to their political groups arranged mainly from left to right, although with the non-attached members towards the back and right of the chamber. All desks are equipped with microphones, headphones for interpretation and electronic voting equipment. The leaders of the groups sit on the front benches at the centre, and in the very centre is a podium for guest speakers. The remaining segment of the circular chamber is primarily composed of the raised area where the President and staff sit. Behind them there is an EU flag attached to the wall with national flags in rows each side of it.

Interpretation booths are located behind them and along the sides of the chamber, while public galleries are located above the chamber around the entire perimeter. Further benches are provided between the sides of the raised area and the MEPs; these are taken up by the council on the far left and the commission on the far right. The chamber as a whole is of a modern design, with the walls entirely composed of lights with large blue chairs for MEPs.

==== Ceiling collapse ====
On 7 August 2008, 10% of the ceiling of the plenary chamber collapsed. No one was injured, as Parliament was not meeting at the time (it was in summer recess), though a number of seats were damaged. A first part of the ceiling collapsed at 18.00 CET followed by a second part at 22.36 CET. No extreme weather conditions were reported and the structure was new, so it was assumed that the false ceiling had a defect. The President's office stated that a third of the ceiling had been affected and that "The preliminary results have revealed that the partial collapse of the ceiling resulted from the breakage of parts holding the suspended ceiling that connects it with the actual structure of the ceiling."

Repair work began immediately, but it became apparent that it could not be repaired in time for the next sitting. Thus, the session starting on 1 September was moved to the Brussels hemicycle. Parliament was expected to move back to Strasbourg for the session starting on 22 September but had to remain in Brussels for that session as well as safety inspections dragged on. The event was greeted with joy by those who oppose the Parliament's presence in Strasbourg, and mocked by eurosceptics who wore hard hats to the first plenary in Brussels after the incident (if Parliament had been sitting at the time, the collapsing ceiling would have hit members of the eurosceptic parties).

In August 2012, the Paul-Henri Spaak building in Brussels which houses the hemicycle was found to be defective as well. Cracks in the beams that support the ceiling led to a security closure of at least six months, as announced by an estimate released on 9 October 2012 by the Parliament administration. This in turn led to a reshuffle of the Parliament's timetable. In early December 2012, it became known that the damage was more serious than previously thought, and that the closure of the hemicycle was expected to last "until November 2013". All "mini plenary" meetings in Brussels until this date were scrapped, a decision that was met with "fury" by some MEPs. Since, as of December 2012, the European Parliament is "having trouble" finding a company to carry out the repair work, it is likely that the reopening of the Brussels hemicycle may take place only in 2014.

=== Criticism ===
When The Louise Weiss building in Strasbourg was opened in Summer 1999, it was criticised by MEPs for being opened without working air conditioning and for the telephones in offices not working. It has been subjected to criticism for its complex interior design: "It is apparently transparent but almost impossible to navigate; there are bridges between different levels, but you cannot quite work out where they lead". When it was opened, it was condemned by some for being "shabby, dark, difficult to navigate" with telecommunications and lifts being plagued by technical difficulties; Parliament President Nicole Fontaine climbed nine flights of stairs to her office rather than risk being trapped in the notorious lifts. In 2002, the building's water supply was hit by an outbreak of Legionnaires disease, due to the lack of use for much of the year (see "Secondary buildings" below) and in 2008 the ceiling of the plenary chamber collapsed (see "Hemicycle" above).

== Secondary buildings ==
There are four secondary buildings across the river from the Louise Weiss. Like the Louise Weiss, most of them follow the numbering system of Immeuble du Parlement Européen (French for "Building of the European Parliament") 1, 2 and 3; the most recent building, (Immeuble Václav Havel), has not yet (July 2017) officially received the number 5. The buildings 1 and 2 form a single complex along the river. The buildings 3 and "5" are located more inland and connected by a glass footbridge. On the site on which the complex was built, there previously stood the swimming pool of the Société des nageurs strasbourgeois (SNS), built in 1952 and demolished in 1978 to make way.

The Winston Churchill building (IPE 1) is located on Avenue du Président Schuman, in the Orangerie district. It houses administration and support facilities. The Salvador de Madariaga building (IPE 2), along Quai du Bassin de l'Ill, is located next to the Winston Churchill Building. Both buildings, designed by the municipal architect François Sauer with the assistance of Jean-Paul Friedmann on behalf of the SERS actually form one single complex with a surface of 58,400m², built at a cost of 81 million euros, inaugurated in 1980 (later modified in 1988 and 1991, in relation to the construction of the IPE 3) and designed in a post-modern style often characterised by convoluted, serpentine architecture, relative heights and glazed facades. The Salvador de Madariaga building also houses the other EU body of which Strasbourg is the official seat (since 1992): the European Ombudsman.

The buildings were at the centre of controversy regarding overpayment of rent. They were eventually bought by the Parliament in 2006.

In October 2007 it was discovered that the buildings contained a larger amount of asbestos than previously thought before they were purchased. However the amount is still not deemed to be a public health risk and is limited to certain areas. The previous owner of the building may be responsible for finding and removing the asbestos within the building. This was not the first such incident as bacteria causing Legionnaires has been discovered in the water system of the complex after a number of officials reported in ill. The bacteria had been allowed to develop due to the Strasbourg complex being used only four months of the year.

The Pierre Pflimlin building (IPE 3), a heart-shaped, comparatively low building built on behalf of the SERS at the crossing of Avenue du Président Robert Schuman and Allée Spach, inaugurated in 1991 as a press and media centre (Centre de presse et d'information) at a cost of 38 million euros, has been given the name of the former President of European Parliament on 6 July 2007. The smallest of the buildings (21,000 m^{2}), it now houses among other things the translation staff.

The Václav Havel building was inaugurated on 5 July 2017 by EP President Antonio Tajani, and French Minister for European Affairs, Nathalie Loiseau. The building, originally opened in 1954, belonged to the Council of Europe, which used it until 2007. In 2012, it was purchased by the European Parliament, which completely deconstructed and reconstructed it.

The Simone Veil building was inaugurated on 21 November 2023 by French Prime minister Élisabeth Borne and EP president Roberta Metsola. It is situated opposite the Louise Weiss building and was originally built as an office building, with the name "Osmose". Inaugurated in 2021, it had stood empty since then, until it was bought by the French state and rented to the European Parliament for €700,000 per year.

== Former buildings ==
The present buildings were constructed for the enlargement of the European Union in 1995, and the then planned enlargement to the east in 2004. As a consequence of the additional member countries in the EU, the Parliament needed a larger hemicycle and more offices for the MEPs. Prior to this, Parliament shared the facilities of the Council of Europe, who had built a hemicycle in their headquarters: the Palace of Europe. That hemicycle was inaugurated for the Parliament's use, and for the use of the Parliamentary Assembly of the Council of Europe, on 28 January 1977.

However, the sharing of this chamber could cause confusion for TV audiences unsure which institution was using it at the time. This was exacerbated by the EU and the Council of Europe both using the same flag, although the two did use their own emblems as well.

Before the Palace of Europe was built in 1977, the two institutions also shared the Maison de l'Europe ("House of Europe") from 1958. The Maison was a provisory concrete building of purely functional architecture and was inaugurated in 1950. It stood where there is now a lawn leading up to the Palace of Europe.

== See also ==
- European Parliament
- Espace Léopold (Parliament in Brussels)
- European Parliament in Luxembourg
- European Institutions in Strasbourg
- Justus Lipsius building (Council of the European Union)
- Berlaymont building (European Commission)
- Institutional seats of the European Union
