= Vaassen =

- Town
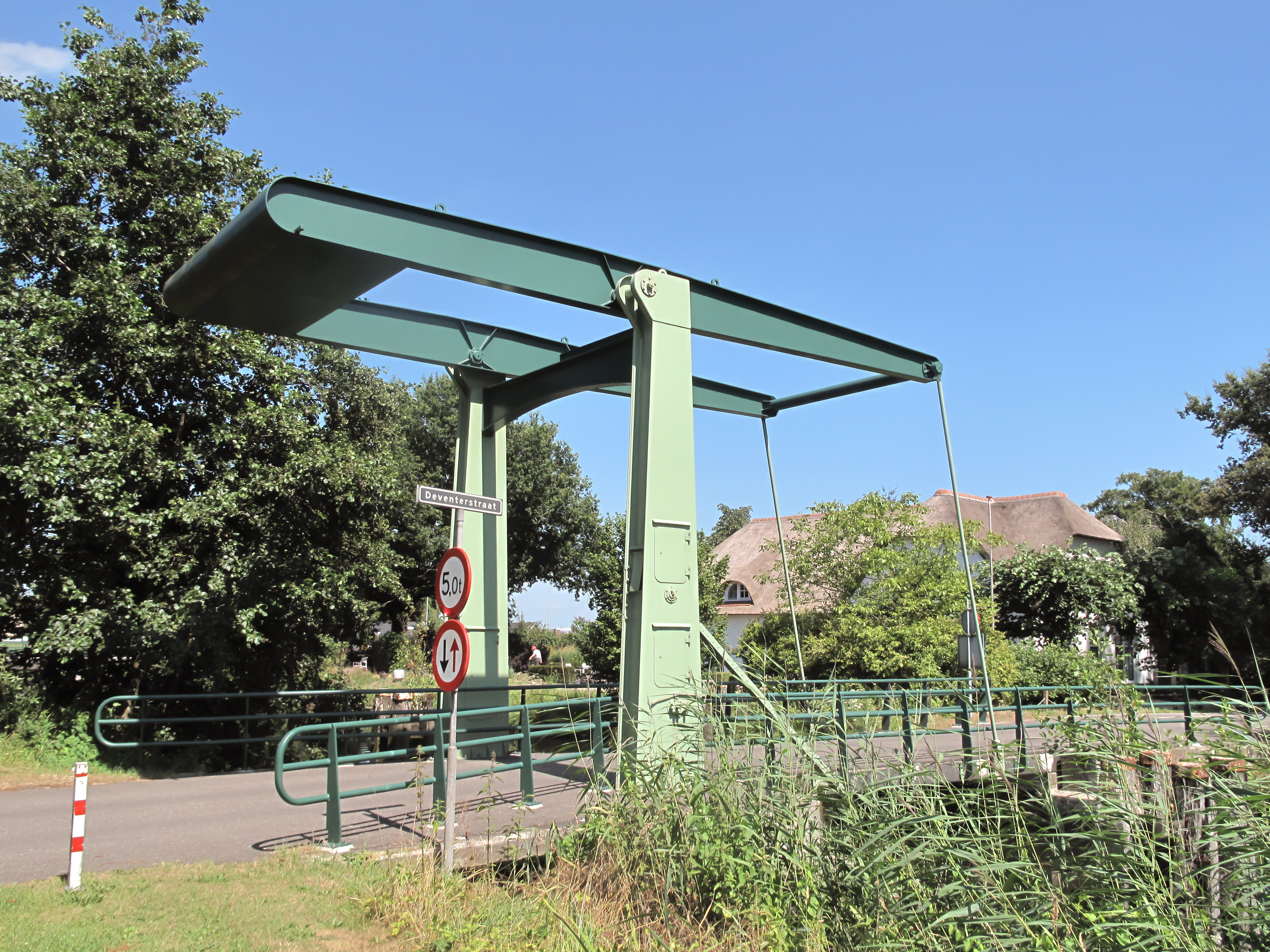
- Drawbridge across Apeldoorns Kanaal

- Flag

- Location in the province of Gelderland Vaassen (Netherlands)
- Coordinates: 52°17′17″N 5°58′10″E
- Country: Netherlands
- Province: Gelderland
- Municipality: Epe

Area
  - Total: 46.94 km^{2} (18.12 sq mi)
- Elevation: 12 m (39 ft)

Population (2021)
  - Total: 12,655
  - Density: 269.6/km^{2} (698.3/sq mi)
- Time zone: UTC+1 (CET)
  - Summer (DST): UTC+2 (CEST)
- Postal code: 8171 & 8172
- Dialing code: 0578

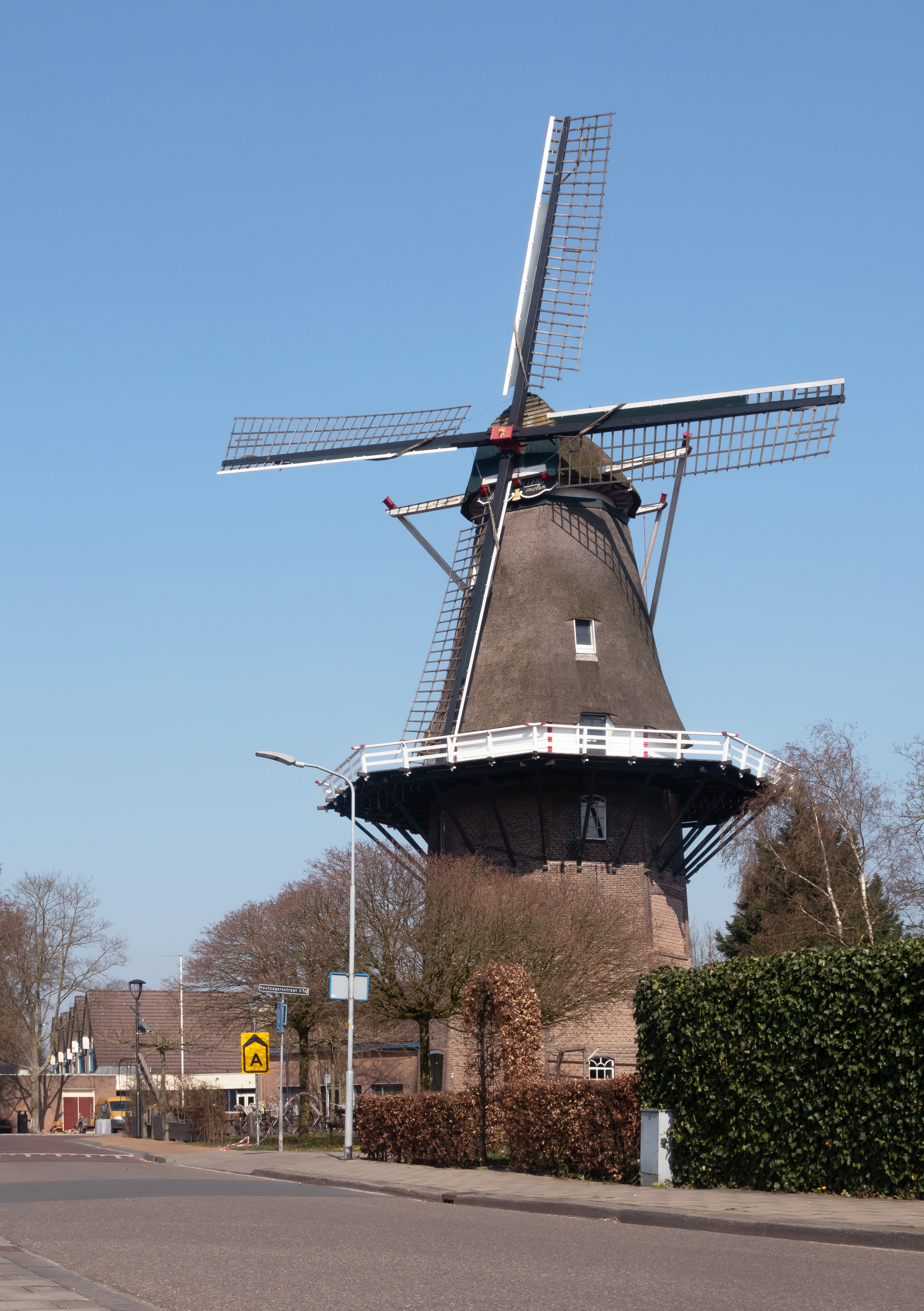
Windmill: Daams' molen

Vaassen (Dutch pronunciation: [ˈvaːsə(n)]; Low German: Vaossen) is one of four villages in the Dutch municipality of Epe. Vaassen is situated between Apeldoorn and Zwolle, on the eastern edge of the Veluwe in the province of Gelderland. Vaassen was an independent municipality up to 1 January 1818, when it merged with Epe.

== History ==
The earliest signs of residents in this area are the burial mounds and "Celtic Fields" (square fields surrounded by small earthen walls, dating from the Iron Age) northwest of Vaassen in the Veluwe, between the Elburgerweg and Gortelseweg. There is a large complex (about 76 acres) of these fields in Vaassen, around Gortelseweg. The German inhabitants were farmers and lived there during the Roman era. They inhabited wooden huts and lived from agriculture, livestock, cultivation of herbs, and hunting deer and boar.

The town was mentioned for the first time in a certificate from the Codex Laureshamnensis of the monastery of Lorschin in the year 891 or 892, when someone called Brunhilde gave a farmhouse and the church to Lorsch. The name Vaassen derives from "Fasna", an old word for a specific rough type of grass.

From 2 September 1887 up to 8 October 1950 there was a railway station in Vaassen. The station was part of the so-called Baron line between Apeldoorn and Zwolle. In 1950 the station was closed because the line was discontinued. The former railway station is still in existence, but is now used as a dwelling.

Vaassen is characterized by a centuries-long coexistence of Protestant and Roman Catholic populations.

In the 1950s, groups of Moluccans were housed in Vaassen. Berkenoord Camp was used for housing. On 14 October 1976, friction with the government regarding housing led to the evacuation of the Moluccans from this dwelling place. Today there is still a considerable Moluccan community in Vaassen.

== Architecture ==
Vaassen's most remarkable historical building is the 16th century Cannenburgh Castle, once home to the knight Maarten van Rossum.

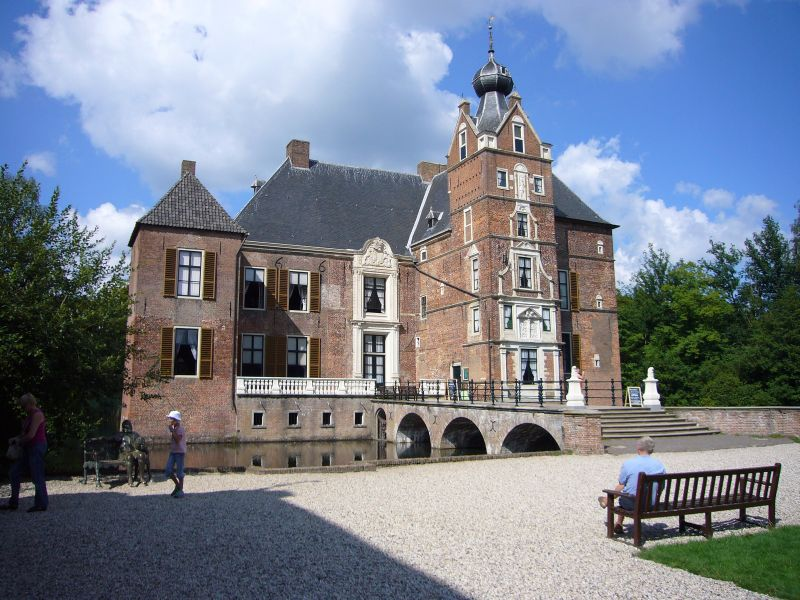
Cannenburgh Castle in Vaassen

== Neighborhoods in Vaassen ==
Berkenoord, Berkenoord II, The Oosterhof, Heggerenk, Oranjebuurt, Transvaalbuurt, Vogelbuurt, Industriewijk, Vulcanusbuurt and Vossenhoek.

== Townships of Vaassen ==
De Hegge, De Jonas, Geerstraat, Hafkamp, Kortenbroek, 't Laar, Niersen, Vaassense Broek and De Uulenberg.

== Sightseeing ==
- Daams' Mill. An 8-sail wind mill with a corn mill function, restored in 1989. To ensure adequate wind for the mill, and also the development of the center of Vaassen, the mill was raised by 4.9 meters by mid-2012. The raising had to be done because of the so-called wind rights.
- Cannenburgh Castle.
- Cannenburger Mill, a water mill.

== Notable people ==
- Anton Pannekoek (1873-1960), astronomer and philosopher
