= Cannenburgh Castle =

Castle in Netherlands

- Kasteel De Cannenburgh
- Vaassen, Gelderland
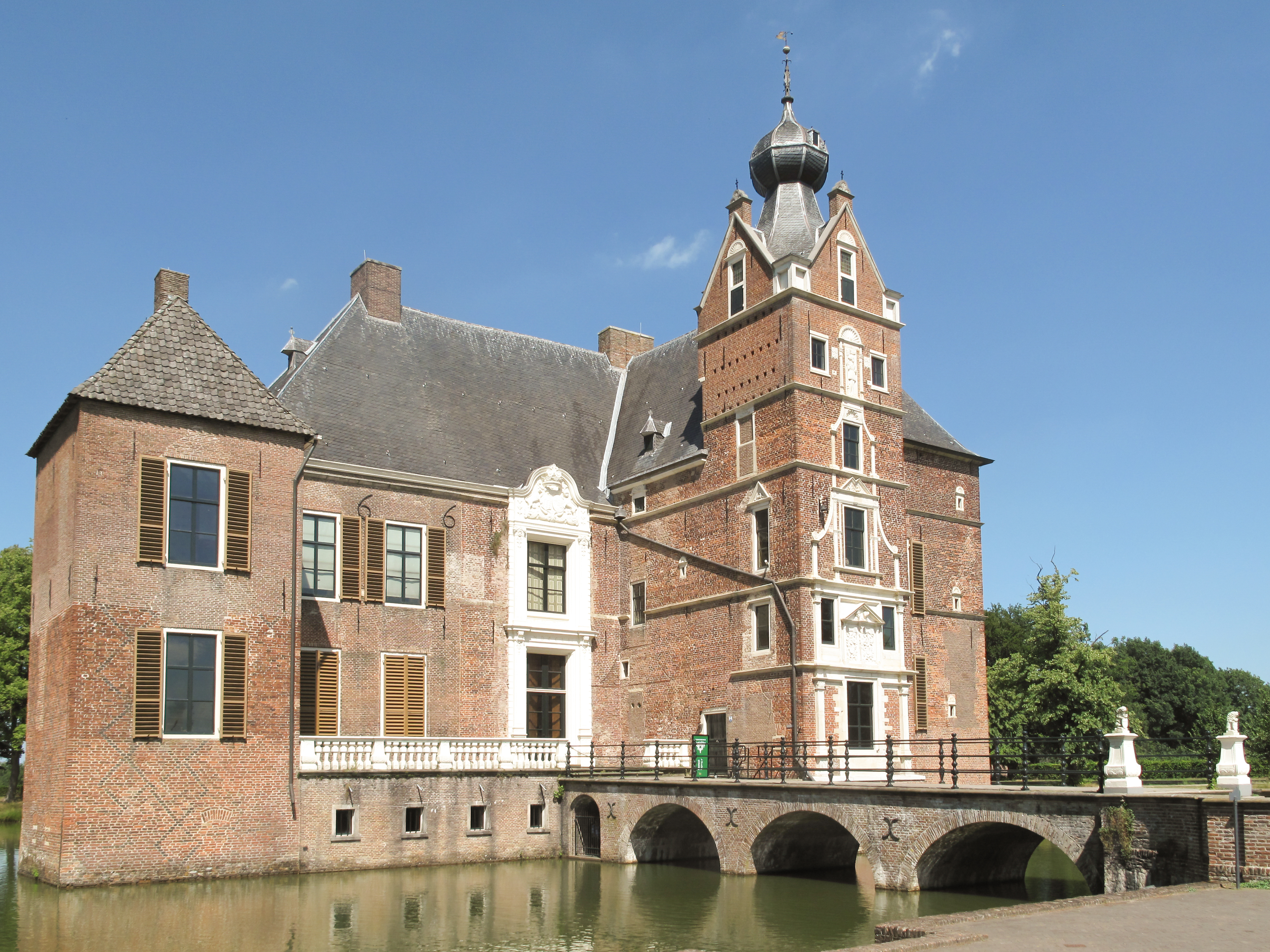
- Cannenburgh Castle

Site information
- Type: Castle
- Controlled by: Stichting Vrienden der Geldersche Kasteelen
- Open to the public: Yes
- Condition: Good

Location
- the Netherlands
- Location within Netherlands
- Coordinates: 52°17′30″N 5°58′00″E

Site history
- Built: 1543
- Built by: Maarten van Rossum

Cannenburg Castle (Dutch: Kasteel De Cannenburgh) or Cannenburch Castle (Dutch: Cannenburch) is a castle with a moat in the Netherlands. It is situated in Vaassen, a town in the province of Gelderland.

== History ==
The Guelderian field marshal Maarten van Rossum built the castle in 1543 on the ruins of an old castle. After his death it was inherited by his nephew Hendrik van Isendoorn, who also supervised the final completion. The castle remained for over 300 years in the family D'Isendoorn à Blois. After the last van Isendoorn widow had died childless in 1881 the threat of the closure of the castle was a probability. In 1882 however it was bought by Eduard Baron van Lynden. 1905 it came into the possession of Mrs. Frida Cleve-Mollard from Berlin whose husband Richard Cleve was the last private inhabitant of the castle. After the Second World War the castle was confiscated by the Dutch government and in 1951 transferred to the "Foundation of Friends of Guelderian Castles" (Stichting Vrienden der Geldersche Kasteelen) for the symbolic price of one Dutch guilder. Between 1975 and 1981 a restoration of the castle took place, the antique furniture has been completed and it has since reopened to visitors.

== The castle ==
The castle was built in the 16th century. Its shape has been preserved until today mainly unchanged. The building complex which contains many elements of the Renaissance architecture is completely surrounded by water. The floor plan is rectangular. There are almost square and covered towers at all four corners. The northeasterly one is equipped with an onion dome. On the front side facing south, another higher onion dome was built. This one significantly protrudes from the facade was. Directly above the entrance the coat of arms of Hendrik van Isendoorn and his wife Sophia Stommel are embedded in a sandstone sculpture. Above another sandstone sculpture shows Maarten van Rossum. The entrance used to be reached via a drawbridge over the moat. This was replaced by a permanent stone arch bridge. Behind the entrance on the ground floor is an elongated narrow terrace followed by a large hall. Several representative rooms can be reached from there: a hunting room (due to the bright color of the walls also called "the white chamber") and a salon on the right-hand side as well as a bedroom and a dining room on the left side. The dining room is connected via a steep spiral staircase to the underlying kitchen. Some rooms are equipped with fireplaces which have frames of Delft tiles. A Boudoir is located in the north-eastern tower. A stone spiral staircase leads to the first floor. The large hall there is equipped with oil paintings of important families from Gelderland. On the eastern side wall a family tree with ancestors from Elbert van Isendoorn à Blois and his first wife Maria Hadewig van Essen is attached. The ceiling is covered with wooden paneling and wooden planks. Another room which is connected to the hall is furnished as a library or study room, which is called the Rode Kamer (Red Room) because of its red wallpaper. On the first floor there is also a small Chapel.

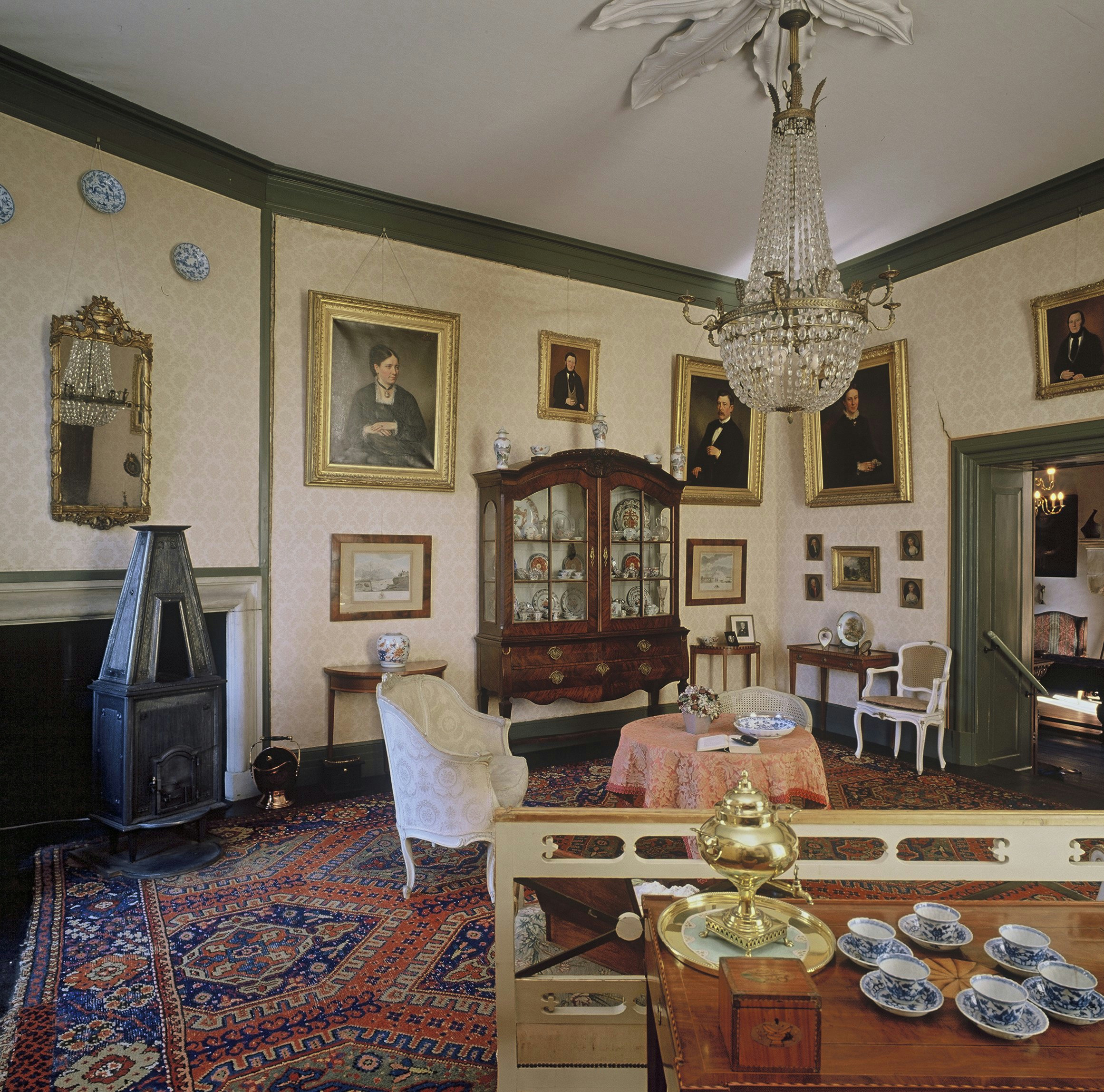
Salon, ground floor

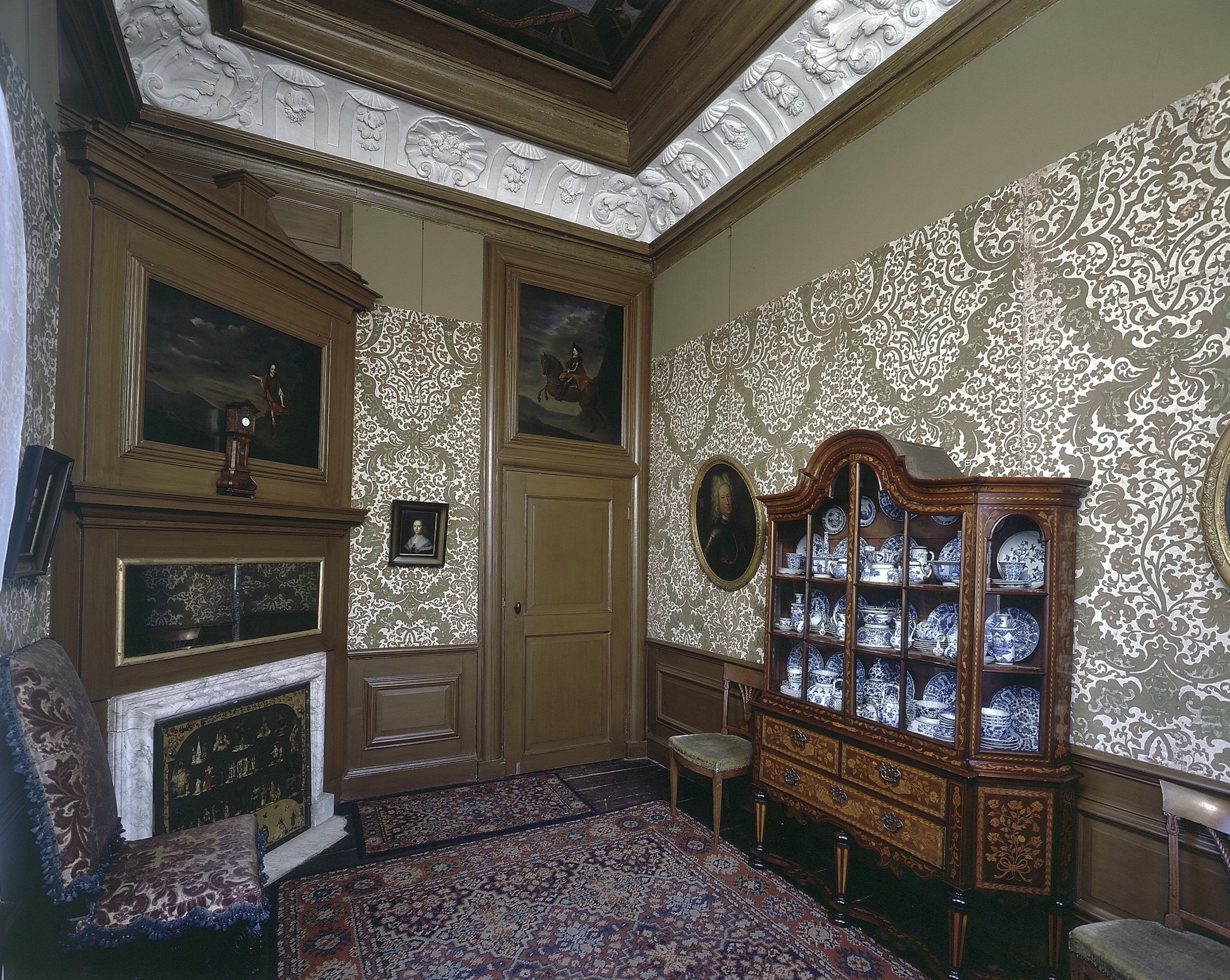
Boudoir

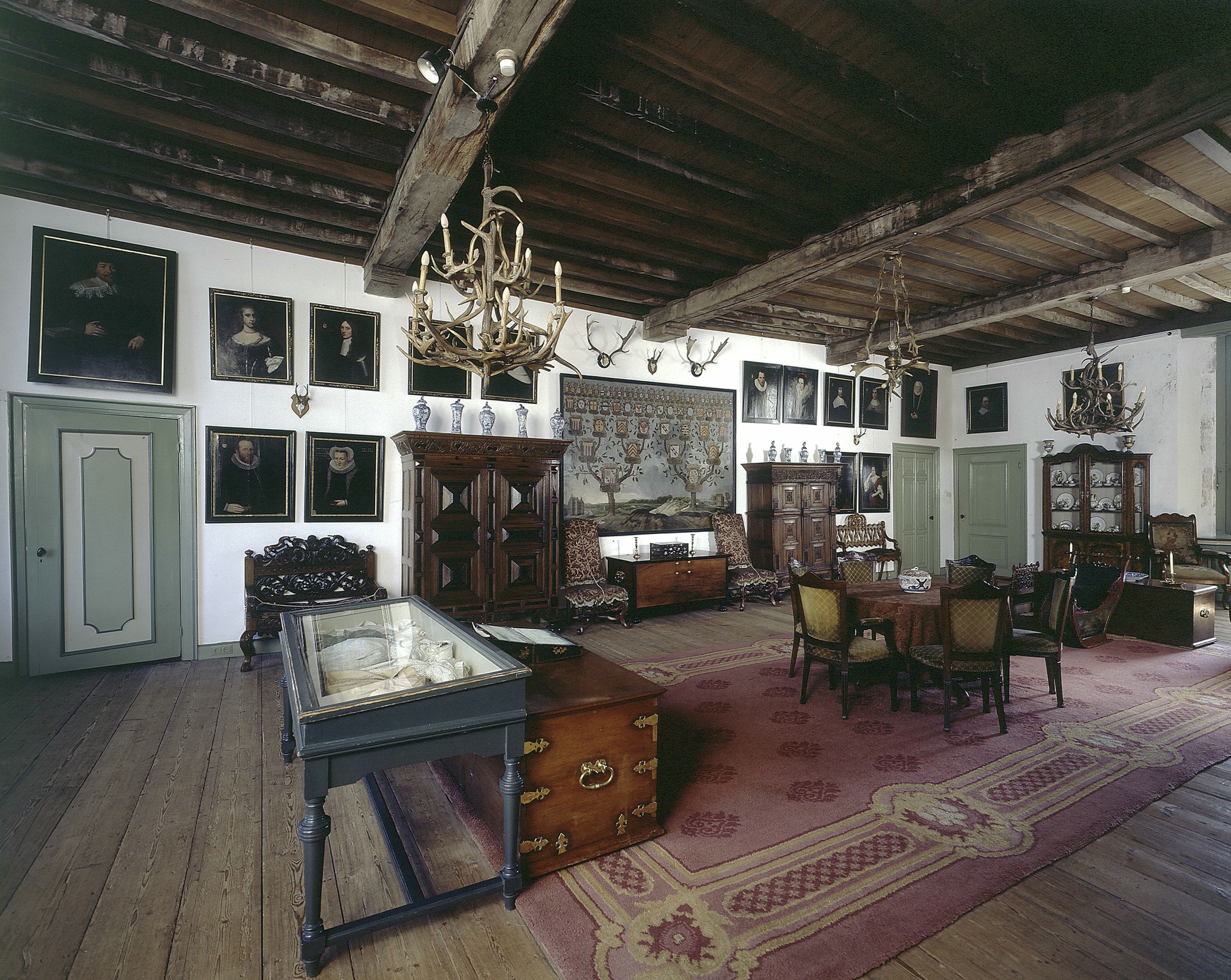
Hall on the first floor

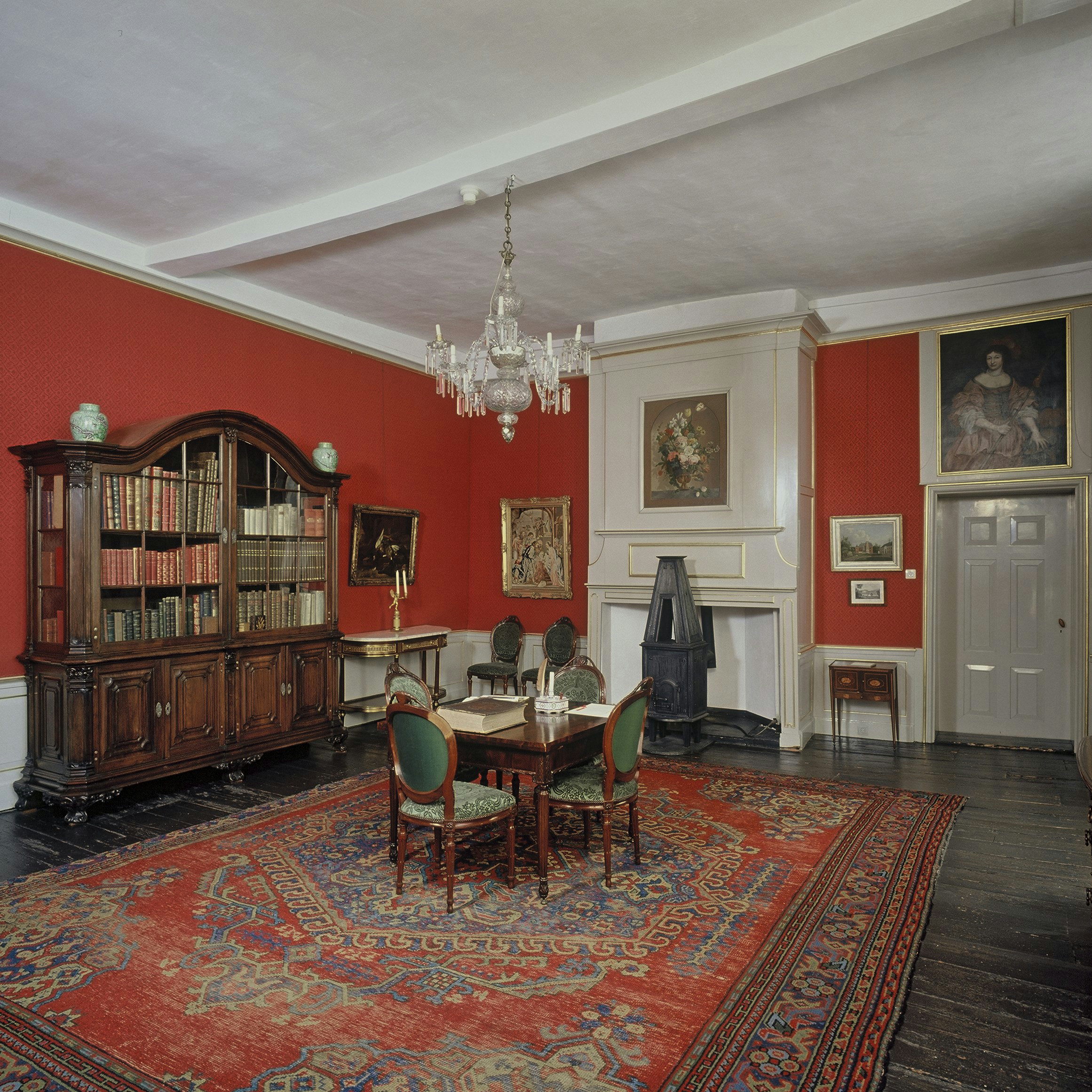
"Red room"

== Supplementary buildings ==
On the west side in front of the castle there is a long building, which was temporarily used as a residence for employees and their families. Meanwhile, it has been changed into a cultural center about the history of the Cannenburgh and the Gelderland province. The former coach house on the opposite east side operates now as a restaurant under its original name 't Koetshuis. A watermill, originating from the 15th century is located northeast of the castle. Meanwhile, it runs with a turbine. The mill is not open to visitors.

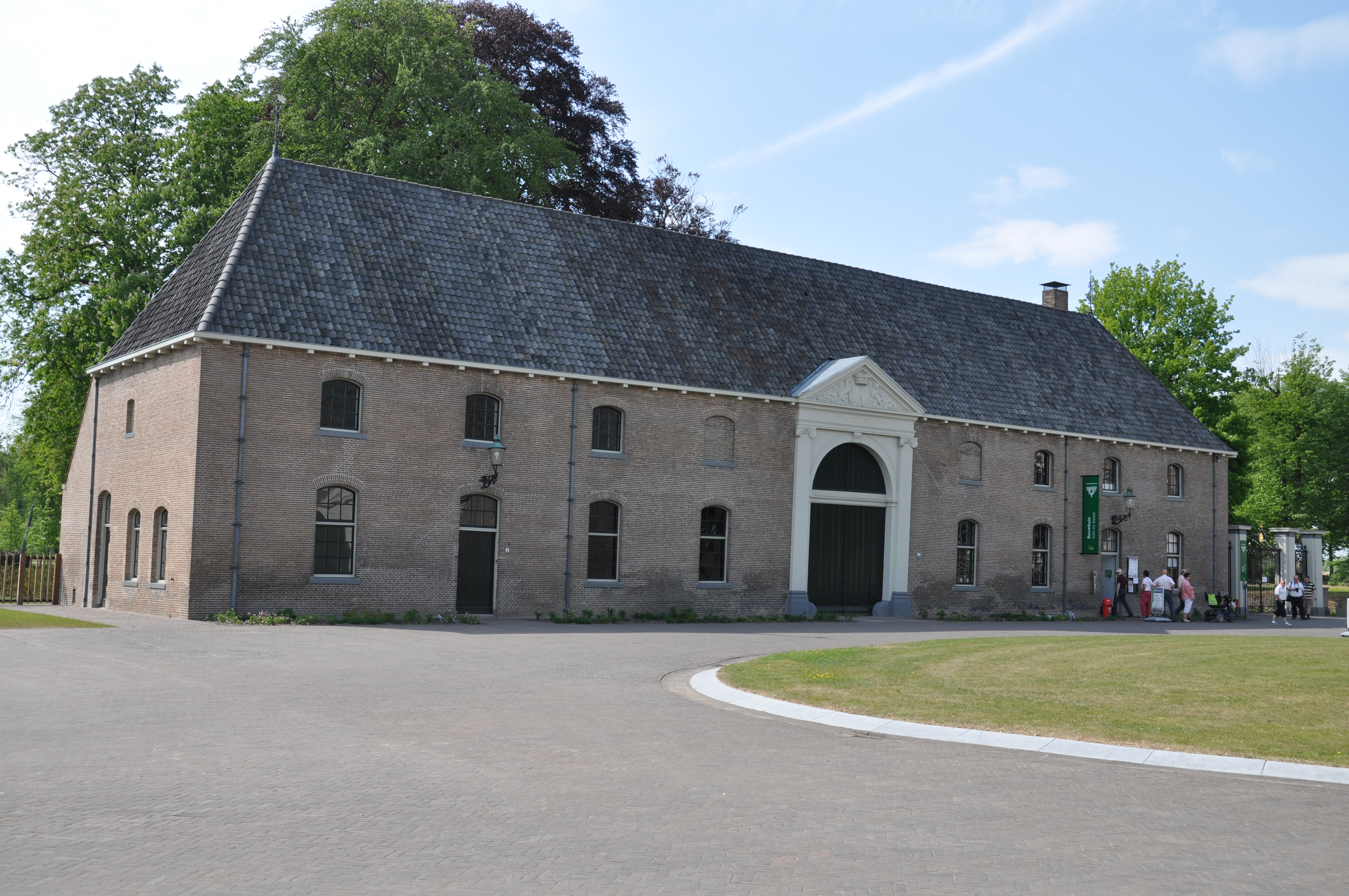
Cultural center

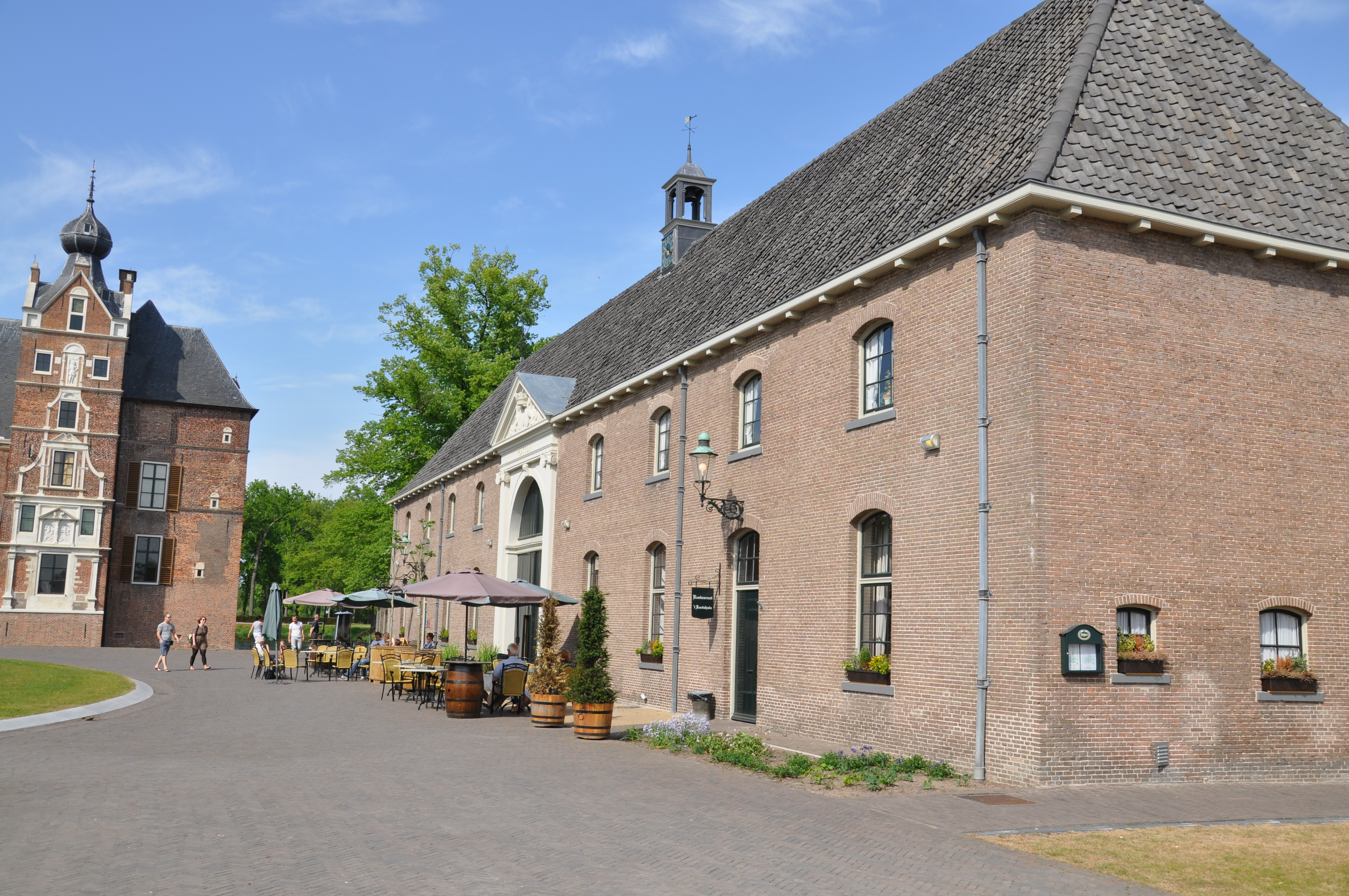
’t Koetshuis

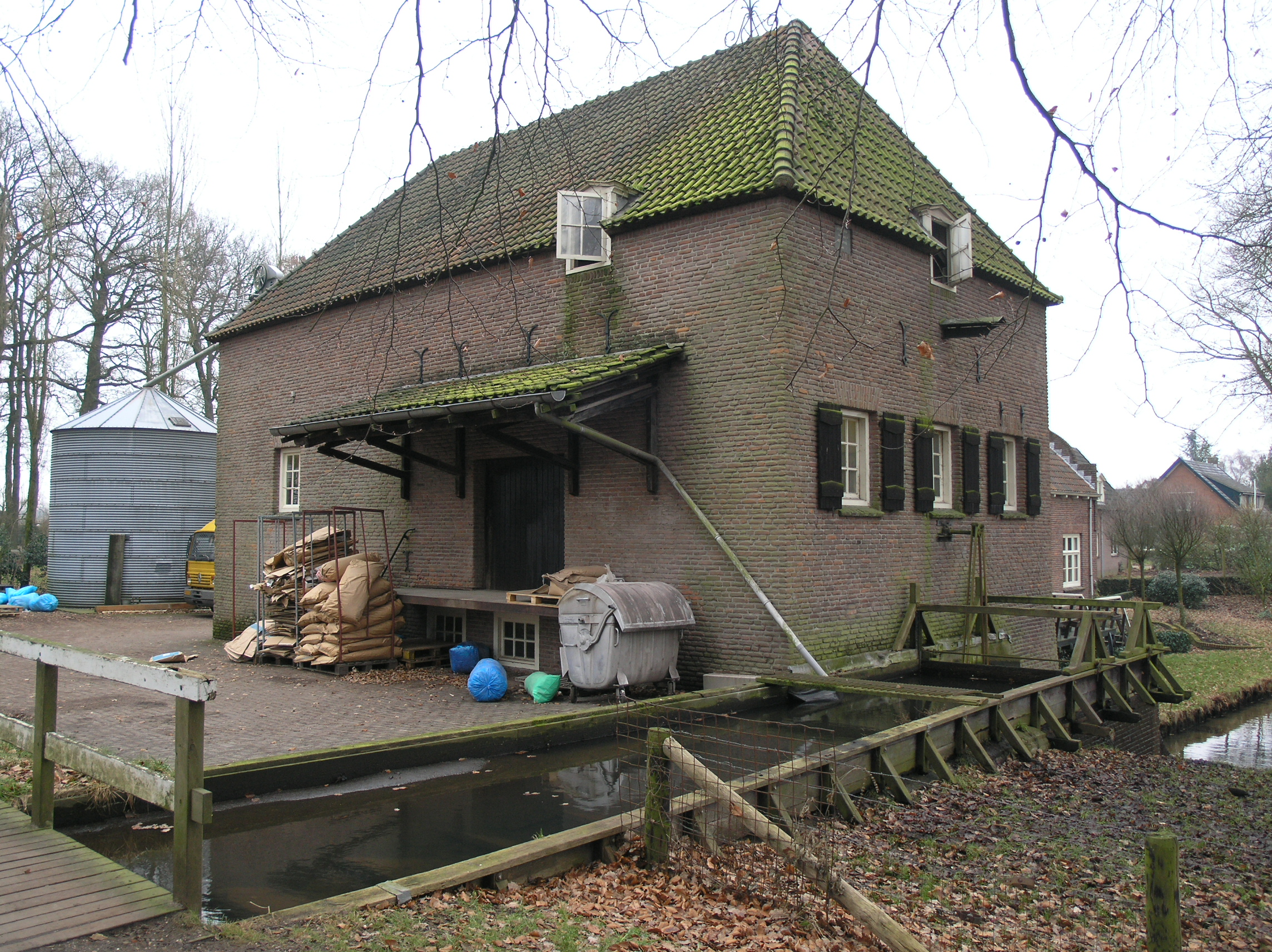
Mill

== Park ==
The total area of the castle including the supplementary buildings and the associated parkland is 24 hectare. The park, consisting of forests, meadows, flower gardens, ponds, canals, cascades and avenues has been rearranged over the centuries several times. The owners were at times also active with the timber industry and fish farming. On certain areas fruit and vegetable gardens were set up for self-supply. Many trees in the park are several hundred years old and the whole area is now used as a place of relaxation for inhabitants and visitors.

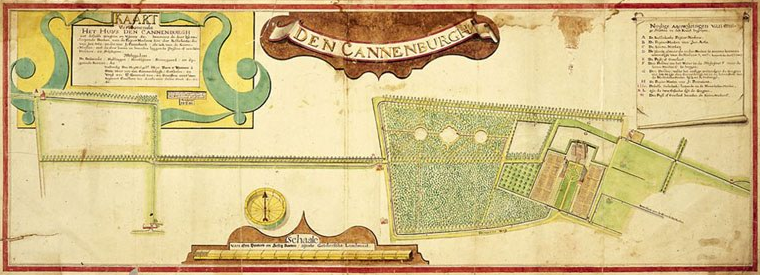
Total area in 1761

== See also ==
- List of castles in the Netherlands

== Sources ==
=== Further reading ===
- Dirk Jacobus G. Buurman: De Cannenburch en zijn Bewoners: Stichting Vrienden der Geldersche Kasteelen, Walburg Pers, 2004, ISBN 9789057302947
- G.G.L.M. Cremers: De Cannenburch; een Gelders renaissance kasteel, In: Stichting Vrienden der Geldersche Kasteelen 1948–1958, 1959
