= Żerniki Wrocławskie =

- Village
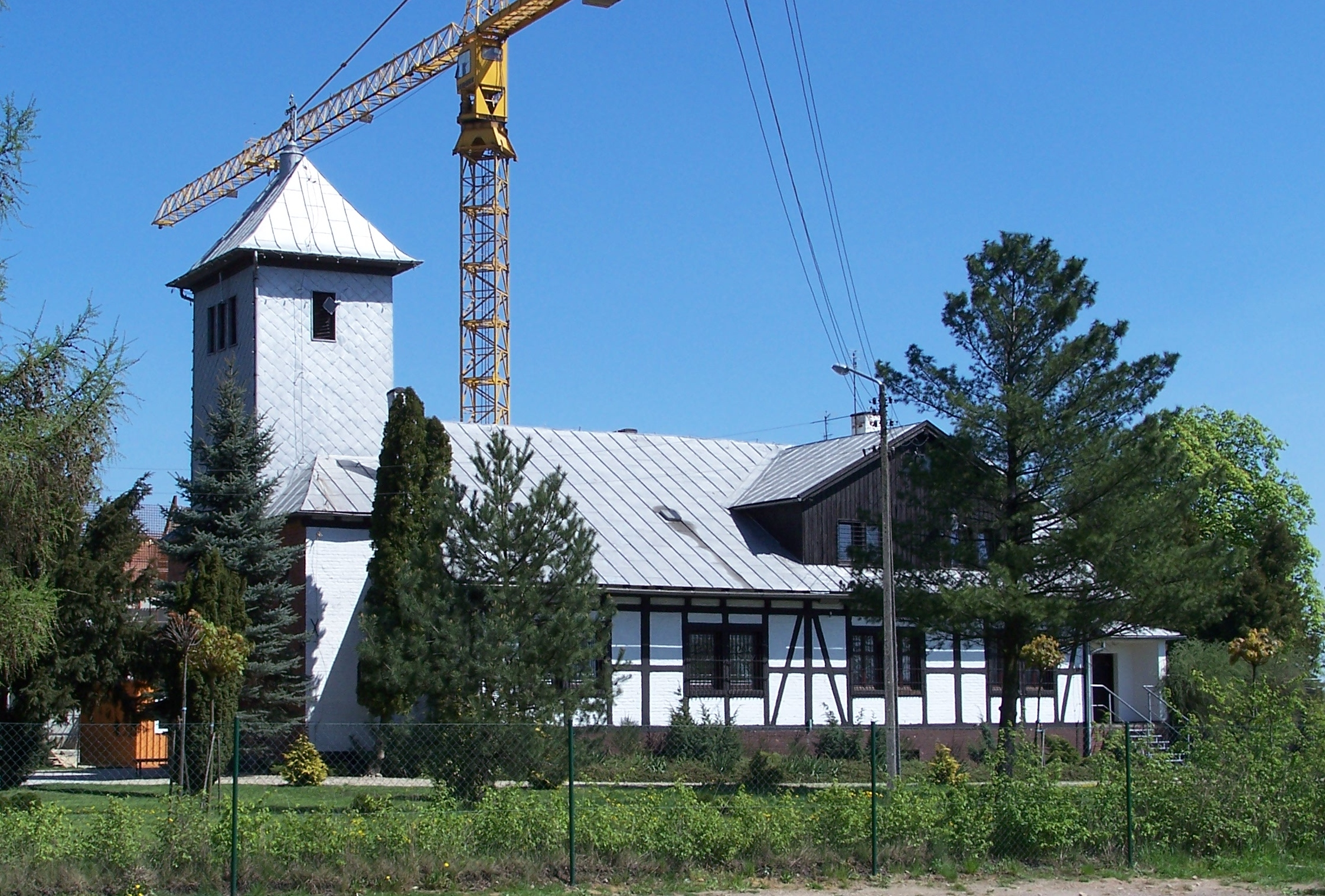

- Location within Poland
- Coordinates: 51°02′00″N 17°03′21″E
- Country: Poland
- Voivodeship: Lower Silesian
- County: Wrocław
- Gmina: Siechnice
- Population: 1,348
- Website: https://www.facebook.com/zernikiwroclawskie

Żerniki Wrocławskie (Polish: [ʐɛrˈɲikʲi vrɔˈt͡swafskʲɛ]) is a village in the administrative district of Gmina Siechnice, within Wrocław County, Lower Silesian Voivodeship, in south-western Poland. It lies approximately 10 km (6 mi) from Wrocław and is the part of eastern part of Wrocław's bypass.
