= Embassy of Poland, Prague =

Ambasada Rzeczypospolitej Polskiej w Pradze Embassy of the Republic of Poland in Prague
- Location: ul. Valdštejnská, Prague, Czech Republic
- Address: ul. Valdštejnská 8, 118-01 Praha 1
- Coordinates: 50°5′26.19″N 14°24′24.88″E
- Ambassador: Barbara Tuge-Erecińska (Chargé d’affaires)
- Website: gov.pl/cesko

The Embassy of Poland in Prague (Czech: Polské velvyslanectví v Praze) is the diplomatic mission of the Republic of Poland to the Czech Republic. The chancery is located at ul. Valdštejnská 8, Prague.

== The Embassy ==
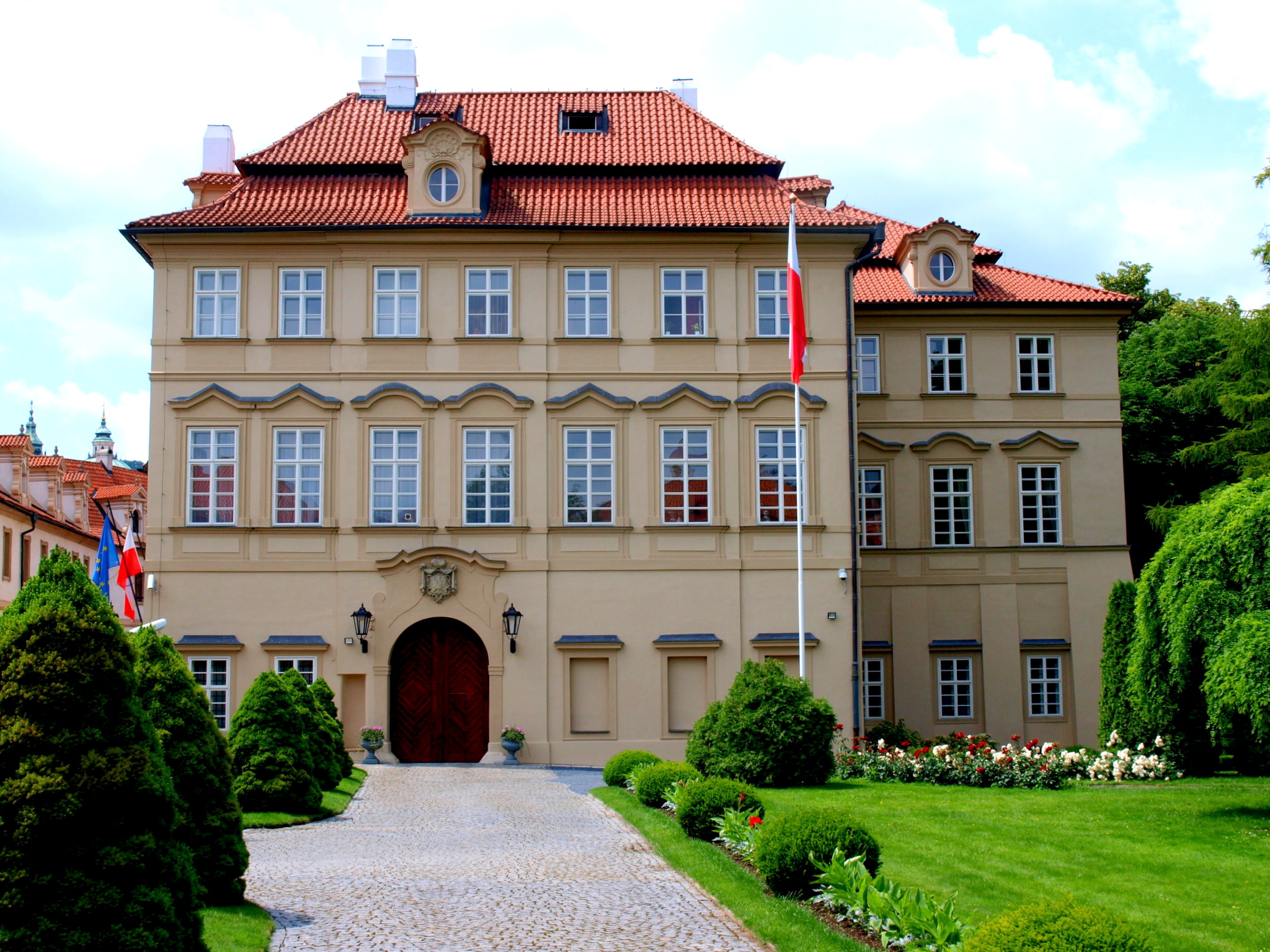
The Polish Embassy Chancery building on ul. Valdštejnská, Prague

The Polish embassy today finds itself situated in a building which was once the private residence of the noble, Berků of Dubá. The palace was originally built in a late renaissance style, reflecting the most popular architectural elements of the time. However, in 1600 the palace was restyled into a baroque form. Enlarged in 1714, the palace was then again redesigned to incorporate the most modern and elaborate elements of high baroque.

In 1822 the palace was bought by the Fürstenberg family who set about completely rebuilding it. The palace was both enlarged and restyled internally, and its garden was redesigned and enlarged so that it would provide better views of Prague Castle directly to the north. It was during these days that the palace came to be known as the Fürstenberg Palace and became known for its lavish receptions. Unfortunately the palace was not to continue its existence as a grand residence for the nobles of the Habsburg lands and soon became a warehouse for the goods of the family business, Fürstenbergských železárny. The building's ultimate saviour came to be the Polish government, who in 1919 purchased the building from the Fürstenbergs for it to become the new permanent seat of the country's legation to Czechoslovakia and since 1994 the Czech Republic.

The building, which is covered with a mansard roof has a number of extremely interesting architectural features. The palace itself is surrounded on three sides by buildings which were eventually, over the years annexed to expand the floor plan of the palace, however on its one open side it is entered through a large monumental entrance surrounded by stuccoed wall decorations and surmounted by the personal coat of arms of Berků of Dubá, the palace's original occupant. Near to this, the original and recently restored official plaque of the Polish Republic is still affixed to the wall of the palace. Additional elements of the palace's design include its long garden, bordered by an elaborate wrought iron screen fence and enhanced within by the addition in the late 19th century of a small fountain. It is from a mast within this garden that the state flag of the Polish Republic now flies.

Internally the palace is characterised by a more baroque styling, which includes a monumental stone staircase which extends from the grand reception hall into the first floor of the palace. The hall itself is decorated with ornamental plaster, stuccos and a large ceiling painting of Polypodiaceae's triumph by a range of unknown artists from the 18th century.

== Other sections ==
Other sections of the embassy in Prague include the Polish Institute which exists to further knowledge of Poland, the Polish language and Polish culture in the Czech Republic. This section of the embassy is located on the upper two floors of a building at Prague's Old Town Square. The institute is particularly noticeable as it is usually covered in handsome banners advertising its presence to any willing passerby. Its presence is also made known by the state flag which, as with all Polish diplomatic offices, is flown from the building's facade.

The consular section of the Embassy of the Polish Republic deals with documentation for all those visa-nationals wishing to travel to Poland or reside there as well as providing many other services relating to immigration and legal advice. The consular section also provides Polish citizens with help confirming there nationality and with the issuing of new passports whilst abroad. It is located at Via úžlabině 14, 100 00 Praha 10.

== See also ==
- Poland – Czech Republic relations
- List of diplomatic missions of Poland
- Foreign relations of Poland
- Polish nationality law
