= Museum of Architecture, Wrocław =

Museum of Architecture in Poland

Coordinates: 51°06′34″N 17°02′32″E

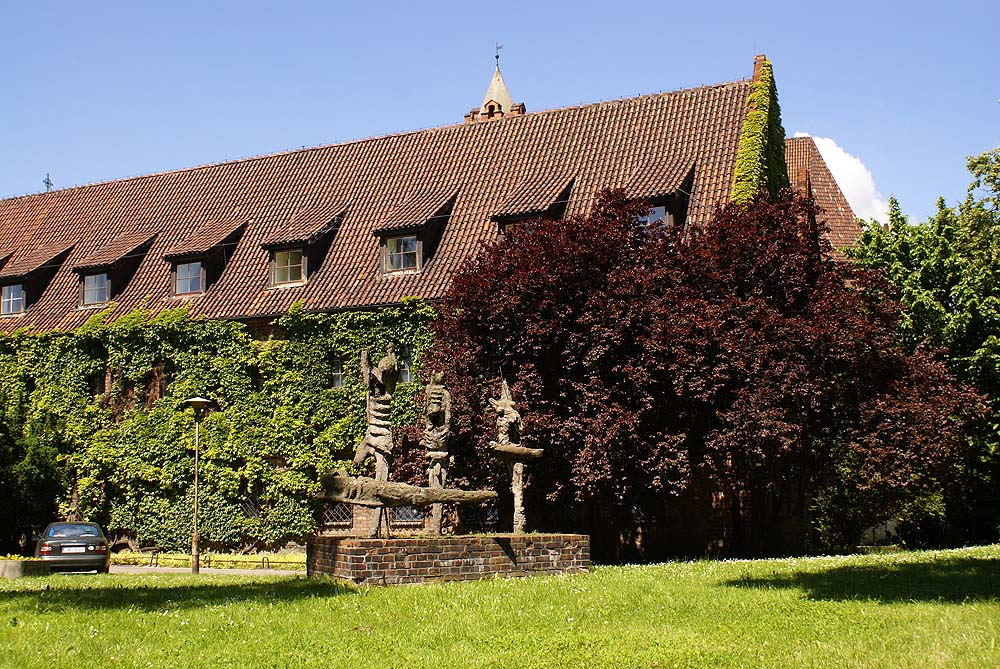
The Museum of Architecture in Wrocław, Poland

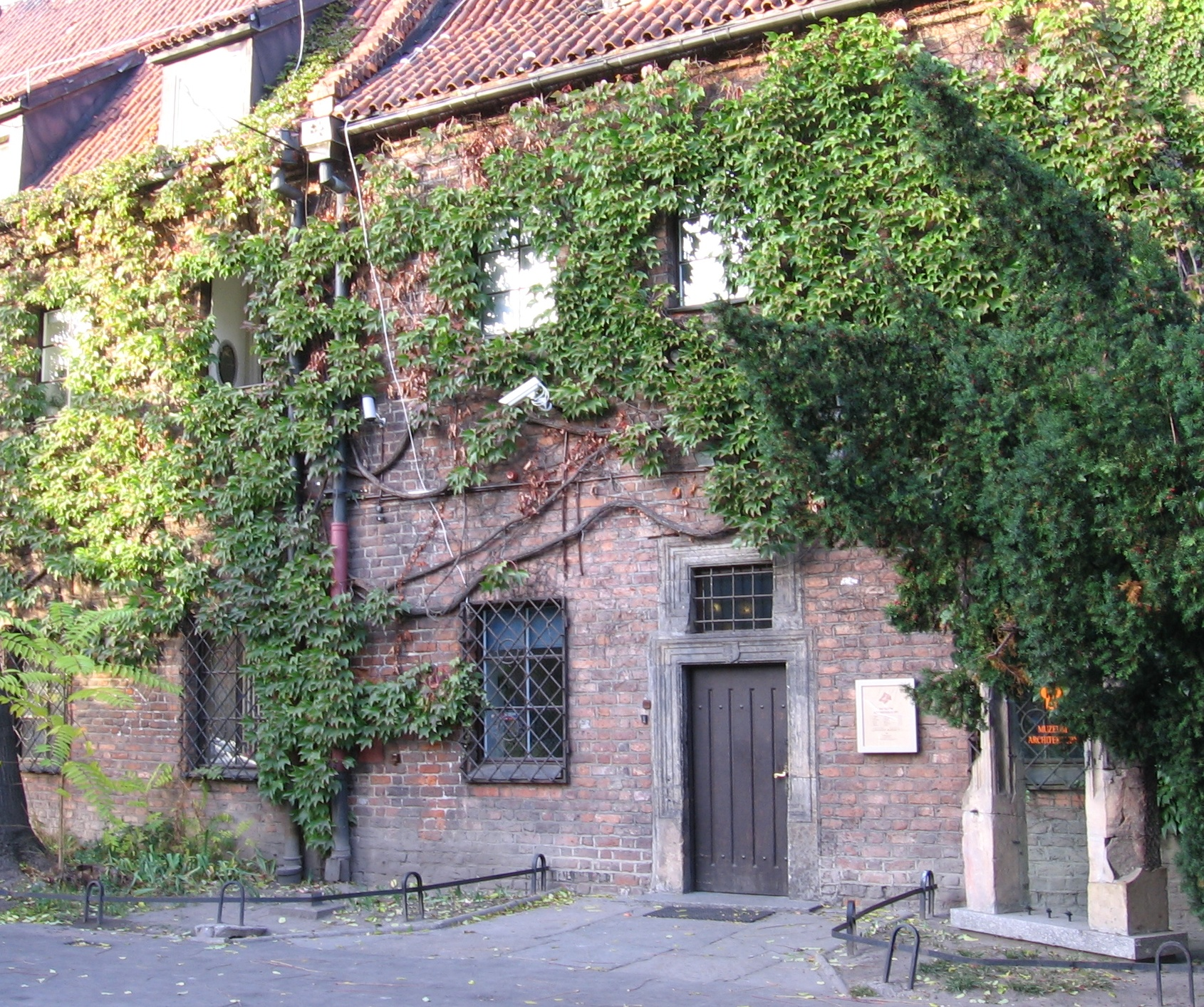
Entrance of the museum

The Museum of Architecture (in Polish: Muzeum Architektury) is in Wrocław, Poland. The museum was founded in 1965 and located in the historic Old Town.

The museum is the only architecture museum in Poland. It is located in a 15th-century post-Bernardine set of buildings, including the St. Bernardino of Siena Church and a monastic quadrangle with a garden.

The Museum of Architecture was a founder-member of the International Confederation of Architectural Museums (ICAM).

The museum's collections illustrate the evolution of architecture in general, although with a specific focus on Poland. The largest collection of stained glass in Poland can be found here. Permanent exhibitions on display are: "Relics of Wroclaw's Mediaeval Architecture"; "Architectural Craft from the Twelfth to the Twentieth Century"; "Wroclaw: Yesterday, Today, Tomorrow"; "The Art of Geometry: A Gallery of Polish Geometrical and Constructivist Art".
