= Venezuelan Pavilion Expo 2000 =

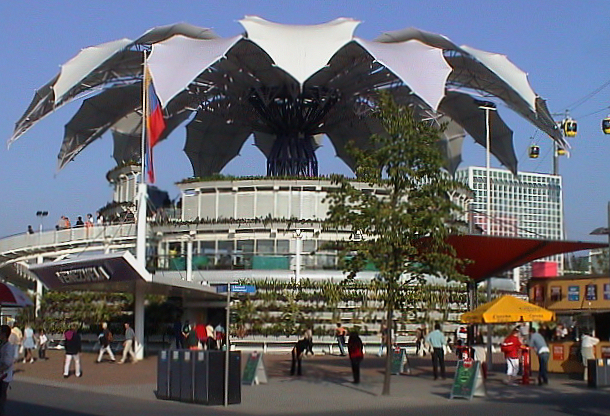
Venezuelan Pavilion Expo 2000

The Venezuelan Pavilion designed by Venezuelan architect, Fruto Vivas, is a 3-story glass, steel, and textile structure shaped like a flower presented during the Expo 2000 in Hannover. Vivas intended the building to be “A flower from Venezuela for the World.” The pavilion was later moved to Venezuela, where it is now located in Barquisimeto, Lara. Vivas collaborated with German engineer Frei Otto for the design of the building.

== Origin ==
=== Background ===
The theme for the 2000 World's Expo in Hannover was “Humankind-Nature-Technology,” with a focus on addressing the relationship between man and their environment. Specifically, figuring out how humankind can harness technology to establish a harmonious relationship with nature. Vivas was proactive in ensuring his architecture was mindful of the relationship between man and nature and the ecological impact of his designs. He incorporates this relationship into the pavilion through the materials chosen, and the Venezuelan flora found inside. The structure itself is in the form of a flower with petals that could move to limit sunlight exposure in the interior. There was a conscious effort with the design to be green by limiting the energy needed for the building and not wasting any materials during the construction. Nature is present throughout the building, particularly in the interior, where thousands of different plants fill numerous gardens. Vivas was determined to incorporate Venezuelan ecology into the building and picks the national flower, the orchid, to model the design of the petals.

== Structure ==
=== Overview ===
The pavilion is a 3-story cylindrical structure primarily constructed of steel and glass with a roof consisting of 16 movable petals. The structure is 39 meters in diameter and 18 meters in height. There are two actual floors and four platforms that make up the interior, and inside the center mast is an elevator to connect the different levels. Throughout the interior, there are thousands of plants spread out in gardens on different platforms. The outside is surrounded by a terraced garden that includes more plants that mirror the interior. The building does not use any electricity to control the internal temperature; the interior is kept cool by the air that circulates through the various gardens. The materials used were recyclable, and the parts are removable to ensure that the building was sustainable and could be relocated rather than destroyed.

=== Roof ===
The main focal point of the structure is the roof consisting of 16 movable petals designed to resemble an orchid, the national flower of Venezuela. To achieve such a look and mobility, Vivas decided to construct the petals out of a textile membrane supported by a lightweight tubular steel frame. There were several iterations before settling on the one finally implemented; the main difficulty was figuring how to support the movement of the petals. Several of the designs either wrinkled the membrane when closed or too complicated and expensive. The final design includes an 18-meter mast in the center of the structure made out of a steel lattice for transparency and weight saving. Atop of the mast is an octagonal capital where the 16 petals are attached.

10-meter petals are constructed of a woven polyester fiber membrane coated with polyvinyl chloride for water resistance. There are eight supporting points where the membrane is stretched over to form the natural shape of the petal. The membrane used was deliberately picked due to its semi-transparent property allowing for natural sunlight to hit the plants in the interior of the pavilion. The initial design called for 8 petals but was doubled to ensure the interior was completely covered during the transition between open and closed. The Sixteen synchronized hydraulic cylinders allow for the roof to open and close in 90 seconds. The roof moves throughout the day, depending on the climate to keep the interior temperate.

=== Interior ===
The interior of the pavilion is open to the inside only protected by the petals when they are in the closed position. There are two complete levels to the building; the first is the ground level one enters through, and the second is a sub-level accessed through a ramp. The rest of the interior is made up of 4 separate platforms connected by the elevator located in the central mast or a circular ramp that spans the entire building. Steel and glass are the two prominent materials used for the interior. At each platform are gardens filled with tropical plants native to Venezuela.

== Present Day ==
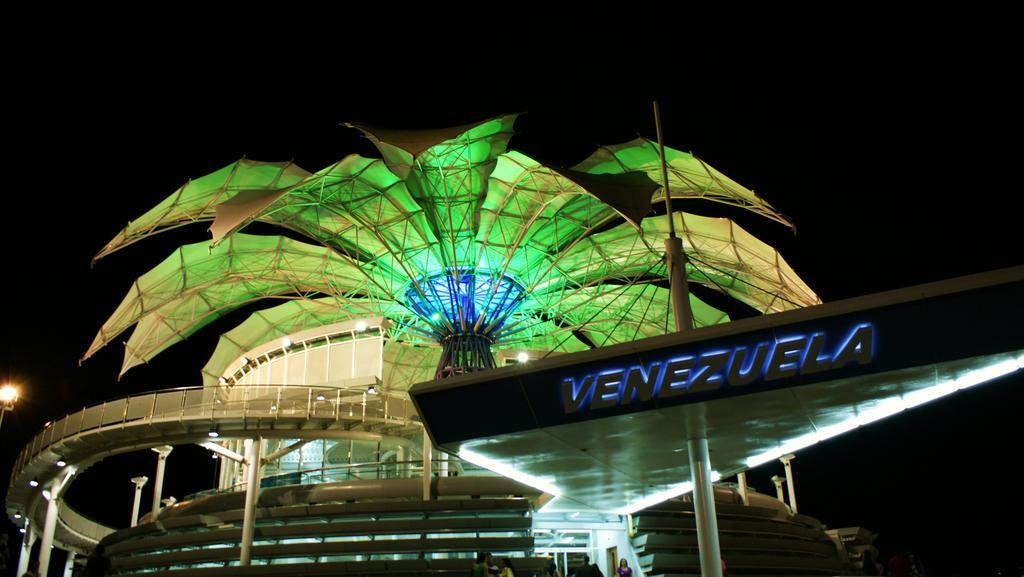
Present Day Venezuelan Pavilion

The Venezuelan Pavilion was intentionally designed to be a temporary structure that would be easy to breakdown at the end of the expo and moved back to Venezuela. Originally, the pavilion was meant to be reconstructed in Parque del Este in the capital of Caracas but ended up in Barquisimeto in the state Lara. The building opened for the public in 2008 and was declared a national monument by the Cultural Patrimony of Venezuela. During the reconstruction of the pavilions, aquariums to showcase marine life, a library, and amphitheater were added. It is now considered a landmark of Venezuela and Barquisimeto.
