= Simona Orinska =

Latvian dancer (born 1978)

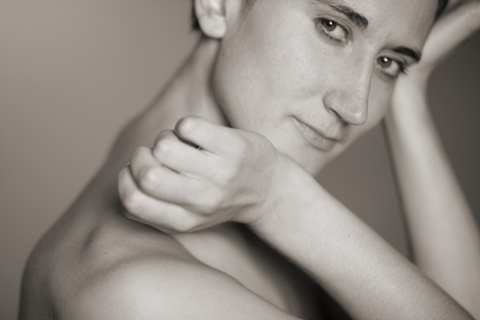
- Born: 18 August 1978 (age 47); Ērgļi, Latvian SSR, Soviet Union
- Education: Riga Stradins University
- Occupation: Poet
- Career
- Dances: Butoh

Simona Orinska (born 18 August 1978 in the town of Ērgļi, Latvia) is a dance movement therapist and Butoh performance artist.

== Early life and education ==
Orinska grew up in Ērgļi, Latvia until she was about 6 or 7 years old when her family moved to the small village of Misa, Latvia. When she was 17, she moved to Riga and started her study at the Riga Applied College. From 1997 to 2000, she studied in the Environmental Design Department, specializing in Object Design. From 2000 to 2005, she completed her bachelor's and master's degrees in arts at the Latvian Academy of Culture. She completed her second master's degree in Health Service and Art Therapist Professional Qualification with a specialization in Dance Movement Therapy at the Riga Stradiņš University from 2006 to 2009.

== Butoh career ==
Orinska had her first exposure to butoh inside a workshop with Sophie Cournede from the Schloss Brölin Art Center, Germany in 2002, and she became active in butoh in 2005.

- 2005 Anita Saij Butoh method (Nordic School of Butoh, Denmark)
- 2006 SU-EN Butoh Method (SU-EN Butoh Company, Sweden)
- 2007 Masterclass with Ken Mai (Riga, Latvia)
- 2007 Butoh dance masterclasses with Ken Mai, Yukio Waguri and Tsuruyama ZULU Kinya (in the framework of Nonverbal Arts Festival "Vertical 2007: Buto Relations”, (Saint Petersburg, Russia)
- 2007 SU-EN Butoh Company workshop and participating in the international performance project "The Chicken Project—Romeo and Juliet” (Sweden, Uppsala, Shakespeare's Festival)
- 2007 Kitt Johnson workshop "Expressive Anatomy” (Denmark)
- 2010 Swee Keong, Lai Chee (Malaysia, Kuala Lumpur, 2010 Nyoba Kan International Butoh Festival)
- 2010 Joao Roberto de Souza (butoh artist from Brazil, in a workshop of 2010 Nyoba Kan International Butoh Festival, Kuala Lumpur, Malaysia)
- 2010 Toshiharu Kasai (stage name Itto Morita) (Japan), in a workshop

In 2008, she was involved in the International Arts Synergy Festival in Riga. She made a multimedia butoh performance titled "Eyes Fluttering in My Knees."

In 2010, she performed "The Sacred Dances of the Night" at the Happy Art Museum in Riga, Latvia on October 30, November 6, and November 27 with Modris Tenisons (artist, director), Artis Gulbis (performance & sound artist), Gita Straustina (video artist), Skaidra Jančaite (Lithuania, singer), Ken Mai (Japan, co-author, consultant of performance), Ērika Māldere (artistic lighting designer) and her companion Aigars Lenkēvičs (graphic designer) from Lamp Design Workshop.

=== Other dance performances ===
Apart from butoh performances, she was involved in a processional art performance, "Somebody who leads", ad a performance in a photo exhibition, "On Haiku". She also participated in an international video dance project (Latvia, England, Portugal, Spain, Chile, Hungary). The premiere was held on August 17, 2007, in the frameworks of the International Video Art Festival “Waterpieces 07”.

== Dance Movement Therapy ==
Simona is a private dance therapy or dance movement therapy practitioner under the supervision of the Medicine Association "ARS". She provides individual and group Dance Movement Therapy to children and adults. Simona complements the individual dance movement therapy with the Champi ("filling with energy" in Sanskrit) massage, which is a type of Ayurvedic massage.

She had two Dance Movement Therapy internships in Bristol, United Kingdom in 2008: one in a dance movement therapy center called "Dance Voice" and one in a special school for autistic children called "St. Christopher’s School”.

As of 20 April 2009, she was employed as an art therapy specialist (Dance movement therapist) in a children's hospital, "Gailezers", and is working with children with psychiatric problems.

She was also one of the founding members of the Latvian Dance Movement, Therapy Association, of which she was a member of the board of directors.

== See also ==
- List of dancers
