= Modris Tenisons =

Latvian mime artist (1945–2020)

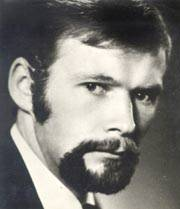
Modris Tenisons

Modris Tenisons (19 March 1945 – 16 September 2020) was a mime artist in Lithuania and Latvia. He was especially well known in Lithuania. He was also a multidisciplinary artist: a theater director, stage designer and theater consultant.

== Background ==
Modris lost his father at an early age. He started schooling in Riga, Latvia when he was six years old. During his school days, he showed talent in art.

=== Mime career ===
After graduating from the School of Applied Arts in Riga, he studied and performed pantomime for four years under Robert Ligera, until he fell in love and emigrated to Lithuania. In 1966 at Kaunas, Lithuania, he founded the first professional pantomime team in the Soviet Union. He directed several professional pantomime theater and radio performances, including Ecce homo (1967), Dream Dreams (Sapņu sapņi, 1968), Do Butterflies (Sargājiet tauriņu, 1969), 20th Century Capriccio (XX gadsimta Capricio, 1970), and Collage (Kolāža, 1971).

Modris was loved and respected by Lithuanians, who considered him as a kind of local 'Charlie Chaplin'. Modris was honoured by the Lithuanian government with an Order of Gediminas for his contributions to the art of mime. He had been retired for years but kept drawing and attracting orders as an artist.

He had remained a legend in Lithuania theater for two generations. In 2003, he was visited and interviewed by a group of Lithuanians to understand him as a phenomenon.

=== The language of ornamental signs ===
Modris also had great interest in ornamentation. He was involved in researching the symbolism of the Latvian traditional Lielvārde Belt (Lielvārdes josta) with 22 ancient symbols. This Latvian ethnic group was a major part of his creative work.

He and Armands Strazds were the creators of the Zime Project, which was the central exhibit of the Latvia Pavilion at Expo 2000. Zīmes, from the Latvian word for "sign", are coloured graphic patterns generated by the computer encryption of texts, pictures, or sounds. During the course of Expo 2000, 300,000 visitors to the Latvia Pavilion generated their personal "zīmes", including the (then) President of Latvia, Vaira Vīķe-Freiberga.

=== Other contributions ===
In 2006 he was involved in a creative laboratory: a survey on actors' psychophysics, nonverbal theater methods and the Latvian sign system. Sixteen actors (Rūta Birzleja, Nadīne Bokovikova, Linde Dambe, Sanita Duka, Ilze Ikše, Jurijs Kondratenko, Dzintars Krūmiņš, Daiga Līcīte, Sandris Majars, Simona Orinska, Dagne Reinika, Ieva Skopāne, Lena Smelova, Inese Upeniece, Agrita Vidže and Zigmārs Zakis) participated in his laboratory, which lasted for 4 months.

=== Personal life ===
Modris had to leave Kaunas and Moscow, where he had dedicated himself to mime, for his native Riga in Latvia. Occasionally, he was engaged in theatrical activities after he got married.

He survived his wife Ilze Tenisone and had two adult sons, Juveris and Peteris, who worked and studied in England. He lived with his daughter Ilze and assistant, friend and life partner Simona Orinska.
