= Expo 2000 =

World Expo held in Hanover, Germany

2000 Hannover

Overview
- BIE-class: Universal exposition
- Name: Expo 2000
- Building(s): Expo 2000 DachHolzkonstruktion
- Area: 160 hectares (400 acres)
- Visitors: 18,100,000
- Mascot: Twipsy

Participant(s)
- Countries: 180
- Organizations: 2

Location
- Country: Germany
- City: Hannover
- Venue: Hanover Fairground
- Coordinates: 52°19′18″N 9°48′44″E

Timeline
- Bidding: 1988
- Awarded: 14 June 1990
- Opening: 1 June 2000
- Closure: 31 October 2000

Universal expositions
- Previous: Expo '98 in Lisbon
- Next: Expo 2005 in Aichi

Specialized expositions
- Previous: Expo '98 in Lisbon
- Next: Expo 2008 in Zaragoza

Horticultural expositions
- Previous: Expo '99 in Kunming
- Next: Expo 2002 in Haarlemmermeer

Expo 2000 was a World Expo held in Hanover, Germany from 1 June to 31 October 2000. It was located on the Hanover Fairground (Messegelände Hannover), which is the largest exhibition ground in the world. Initially, some 40 million people were expected to attend the exhibition over the course of months; however, eventually with less than half of this number, the Expo was a flop and turned out to be a financial failure.

The Expo's masterplan was designed in a joint venture with Studio d'Arnaboldi / Cavadini, Locarno and AS&P (Albert Speer und Partner GmbH).

== History ==
=== Background ===
On 14 June 1990, the international organization sanctioning World Expos Bureau International des Expositions awarded Expo 2000 to Hanover, beating out Toronto by a 21 to 20 vote. In 1992, the architects Studio Arnaboldi/Cavadini of Locarno won an international design competition for the master plan of the exhibition grounds. On 12 June that year, a survey conducted by the city council was made public, showing only 51.5% of area residents supported hosting the expo.

=== Construction ===
On 5 May 1994, a new company was created by the government in Bonn, Gesellschaft zur Vorbereitung und Durchführung der Weltausstellung EXPO 2000 in Hannover (EXPO 2000 Hannover GmbH). Headed by chairman Helmut Werner, the company was responsible for the construction and management of the Expo.

In 1995, the supervisory board agreed on the concept for the thematics of the Expo. Construction finally began on 22 April 1996.

Unlike previous expos, which focused on present advances in science and technology, EXPO 2000 focused more on developing and presenting solutions for the future.

=== World Expo 2000 ===
The Expo opened to the public on 1 June 2000 and ran for five months, ending on 31 October.

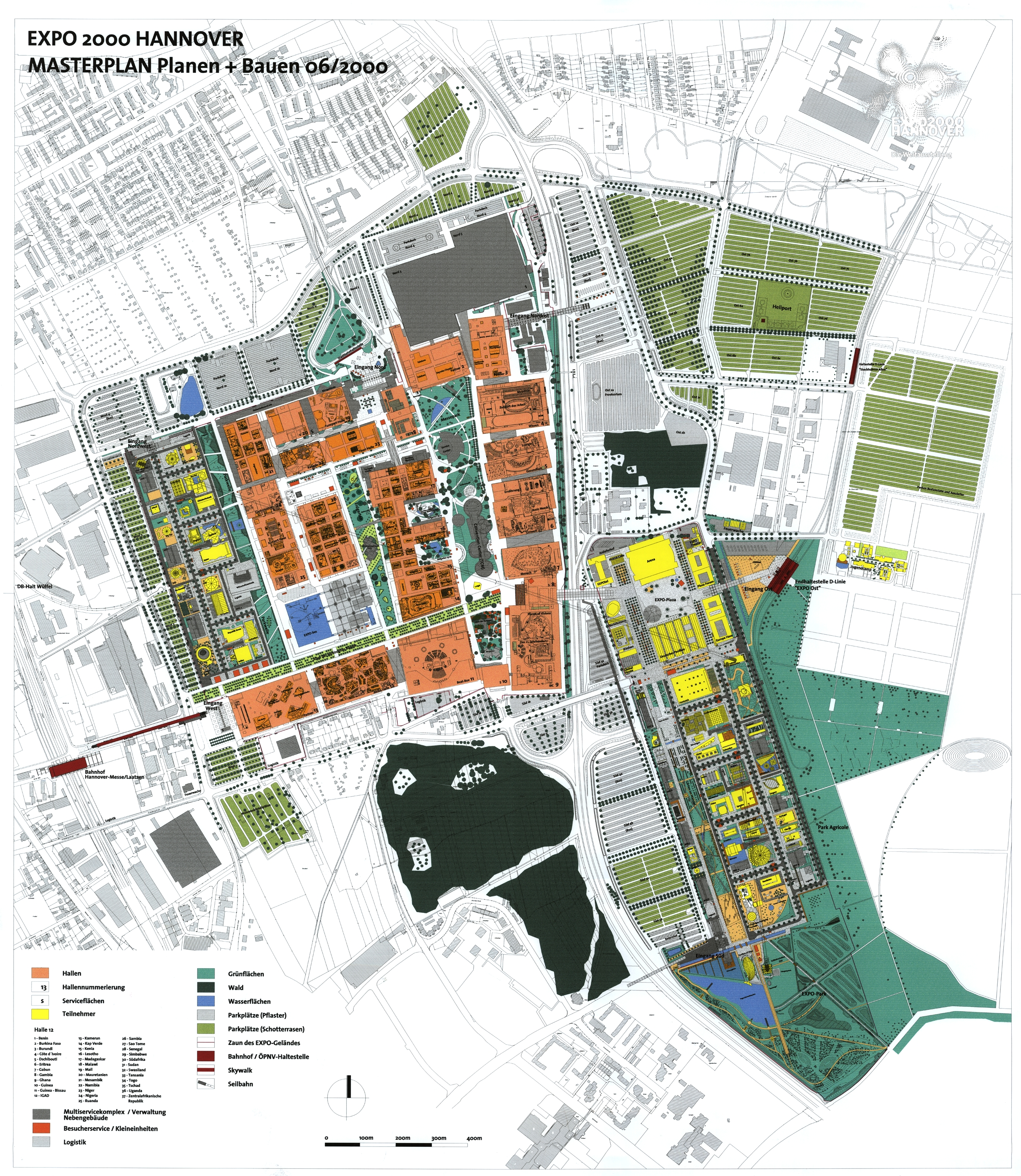
Master plan of the Expo

The Expo site was situated on the original 1,000,000 m^{2} (11,000,000 sq ft) of the Hanover fairground; an additional 600,000 m^{2} was also made available as a newly opened section of the grounds. As a visitor walked in and tickets were taken, looking above to the approximately four-story-high ceiling, a visitor would have noticed the huge circular pods that held large TVs showing animated people greeting the visitors and providing tourist information in different languages. Some ten large McDonald's restaurants were also built, along with restaurants representing several of the exhibitor countries. Small retail locations were also set up to supply Expo merchandise. The United States reversed its decision to take part at a relatively late stage, and the area set aside for the American pavilion was left undeveloped.

40,000,000 visitors were expected at Expo 2000, but only 25,210,000 people came to see the event. This led to a financial deficit of about US$600,000,000. With pre-ordered tickets priced at DM 69 (US$32.58), the Expo seemed expensive compared to other days out. Commentator Georg Giersberg wrote in the Frankfurter Allgemeine that entrance fees for Germany's 53 main theme parks cost on average less than half the price of the Expo (about 30 DM). Other financial shortfalls came from a lack of corporate sponsorship, since it cost US$4.8 million to be an official product supplier or US$14.5 million to become a world partner.

Part of the failure of the Expo was a lack of clear perception of what to expect at Expo 2000, not helped by a "cerebral" advertising campaign that had failed to explain what the Expo was for. In a 2000 Time article, a Berlin-based marketing firm, Scholz & Friends, stated that "the organizers have failed to convey to the public a clear image of what Expo 2000 is going to be: an entertainment park, a blown-up museum, or a nature reserve." In the same article, Ralf Strobach, secretary of Hanover's Citizens' Initiative for Environment Protection, said that "For a long time, companies were unsure if they would be putting money in an eco-show or a showcase for their latest inventions." Only after the Expo was open and clearly not meeting expectations was a new advertising campaign created, aimed at the domestic market with British actor Peter Ustinov and German television star Verona Feldbusch and stressing the fun side of the Expo, under the slogan "Das gibt's nur einmal, es kommt nie wieder" ("This only happens once, it's never coming back").

The German band Kraftwerk created a vocoded speech signature theme, "Expo 2000", which was also developed into a single of the same name. Later, a remix single "Expo Remix" was released. The band was also paid US$190,000 for a five-second jingle, leading Chancellor Gerhard Schröder to state that he "wouldn't have spent so much money".

== Settlement ==
The western slope of Kronsberg emerged in the late 1990s in conjunction with the Expo 2000, established an environmental point of settlement at the Hannover Expo. The district is a result of independent evolutionary history and unique structure, often perceived as a separate district.

== Pavilions ==
=== Themed ===
- The 21st Century
- Planet of Visions
- Human
- Knowledge
- Mobility
- Communication
- Energy
- Health
- Nutrition
- Environment
- Basic Needs
- Future of Labour

=== National ===
In total, 155 nations took part. Some are outlined below:

- The Bhutan Pavilion – A Buddhist Temple brought from Bhutan to the World Exhibition in Hannover, having been prefabricated in 16,000 construction parts in Bhutan.
- Finland – Titled "Wind Nest", the building was created by architects Sarlotta Narjus and Antti-Matti Siikala. Four-storey twin buildings measuring 50 x 7.5 m each were clad in heat-treated thermowood. The two buildings were connected by bridges, allowing visitors to move amongst the three exhibit halls on the first two stories. A 15 m wide birch forest was also created.
- Germany – Designed by architect Wund Gruppe, the 24,000 m² building was the largest nation pavilion at Expo.
- Japan – The Japanese Pavilion was a gridshell structure made out of recycled paper tubes that created a honeycomb-like building. The German authorities refused to allow a paper-only structure, literally held together at the joints by tape, so a secondary supporting structure made of wood was created to obtain the needed legal approval. Designed by architect Shigeru Ban along with consultants Frei Otto (the German architect who created the Olympic Stadium in Munich and the German pavilion at Expo 67 in Montreal), Buro Happold (the British engineering firm which created the Millennium Dome) and Stefan Polónyi (a structural engineering professor), the building took 3 weeks to assemble and covered an exhibit area of 72 m (long) x 35 m (wide) x 15.5 m (high), the pavilion's lot size was 5,450 m² and its building surface area 3,600 m².
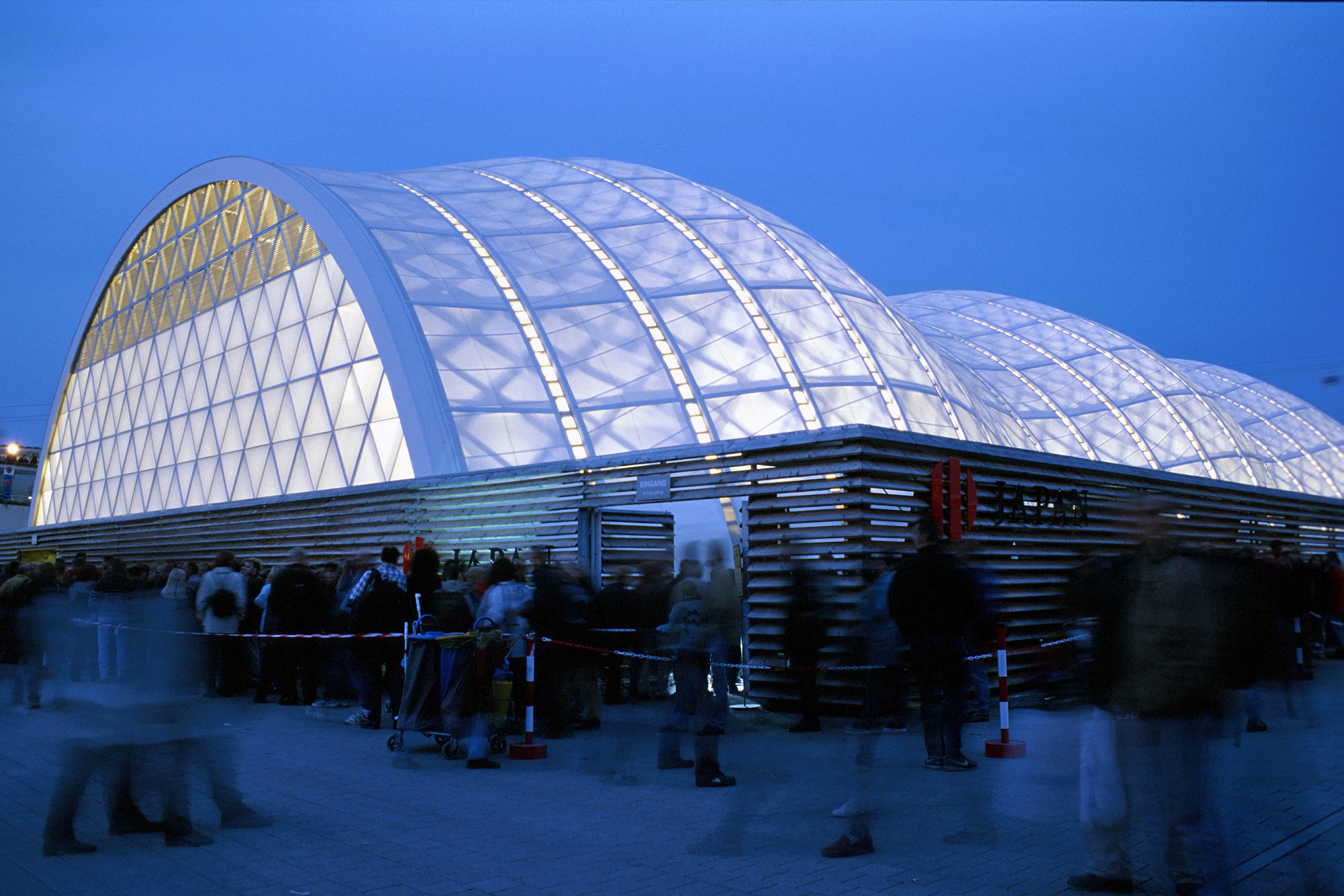
  Japanese pavilion
- Latvia – about 300,000 people participated in the "Zime" project created by Armands Strazds and Modris Tenisons.
- Lithuania – The pavilion was designed by Marina and Audrius Bučas, Gintaras Kuginys, Valdas Ozarinskas and Aida Čeponytė. The building was a futuristic glossy yellow. The main attraction was the film "Flight over Lithuania".
- Mexico – The pavilion consisted of five separate buildings linked by ramps, and after the Expo, was relocated to the Braunschweig Fine Arts College. The architect was Ricardo Legorreta.
- Monaco – Monaco contributed at the exhibition by constructing a hypermodern modular prefabricated pavilion which was designed by the architect Hans Ferdinand Degraeuwe.
- Mongolia – Mongolia participated at the exhibition by constructing a nomadic town of the 13th century, called "Chingis’s Town", covering one hectare. The pavilion was designed by the architect Adiya Baldandorj Bayud, to show the ger residences of Great Khans of the Mongol Empire of the 13th century. The feature of this town was that it created the town with ger, ger-carriage and various kinds of cotton residents, which are different in forms, sizes and applications, used by Mongolians of that century. Moreover, the King’s privilege armchair, clothing and accessories of ancient heroes and weapons were shown in the "Chingis's Town".
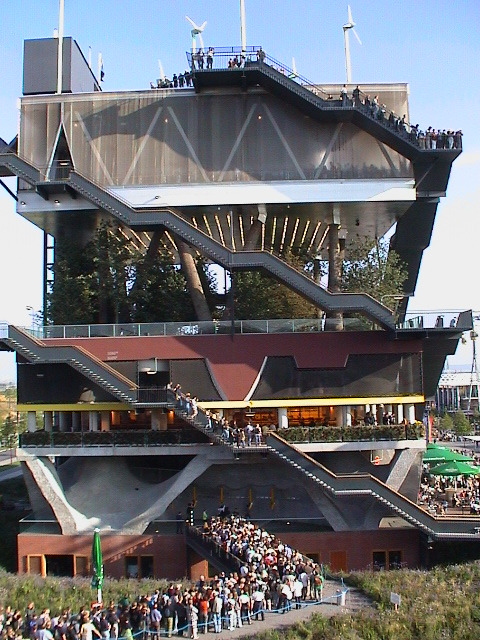
  The Dutch pavilion
- Netherlands was located at '3' Europa Boulevard, and the Dutch pavilion was one of the most popular buildings, winning international acclaim, and was designed by the firm MVRDV. The theme of the 36 m high building (the Expo's tallest structure) was "Holland creates Space". Six Holland eco-system landscapes were stacked to showcase how a country can make the most out of a small space. Guests entered on the ground floor and moved through the exhibit space via grand exterior staircases that wrapped around the building. The top level contained a small lake surrounded with windmills that generated power for the building. The interior spaces were designed by MET Studio. The original plan was to dismantle the building and move it back to Amsterdam, but it was determined that it would be much cheaper to just create a new building from scratch. The building sat empty and was partially looted with windows smashed and garbage everywhere, until 2020, when MVRDV announced the plan to transform the building into an office and student housing complex.
- Portugal – Designed by architects Álvaro Siza Vieira and Eduardo Souto de Moura, the 2,350 m² pavilion was located on the Europa Boulevard. The prefabricated two-story building was covered with around 55 tons of expanded cork agglomerate and with hand-made glazed tiles on the patio and had a double glass fibre canvas membrane roof.
- Spain – Designed with the theme "Familiarity and Solidarity."
- Switzerland – The 3019 square meter pavilion designed by Peter Zumthor was built of stacked wooden beams of larchwood and Scots pine held together by steel rods and springs.
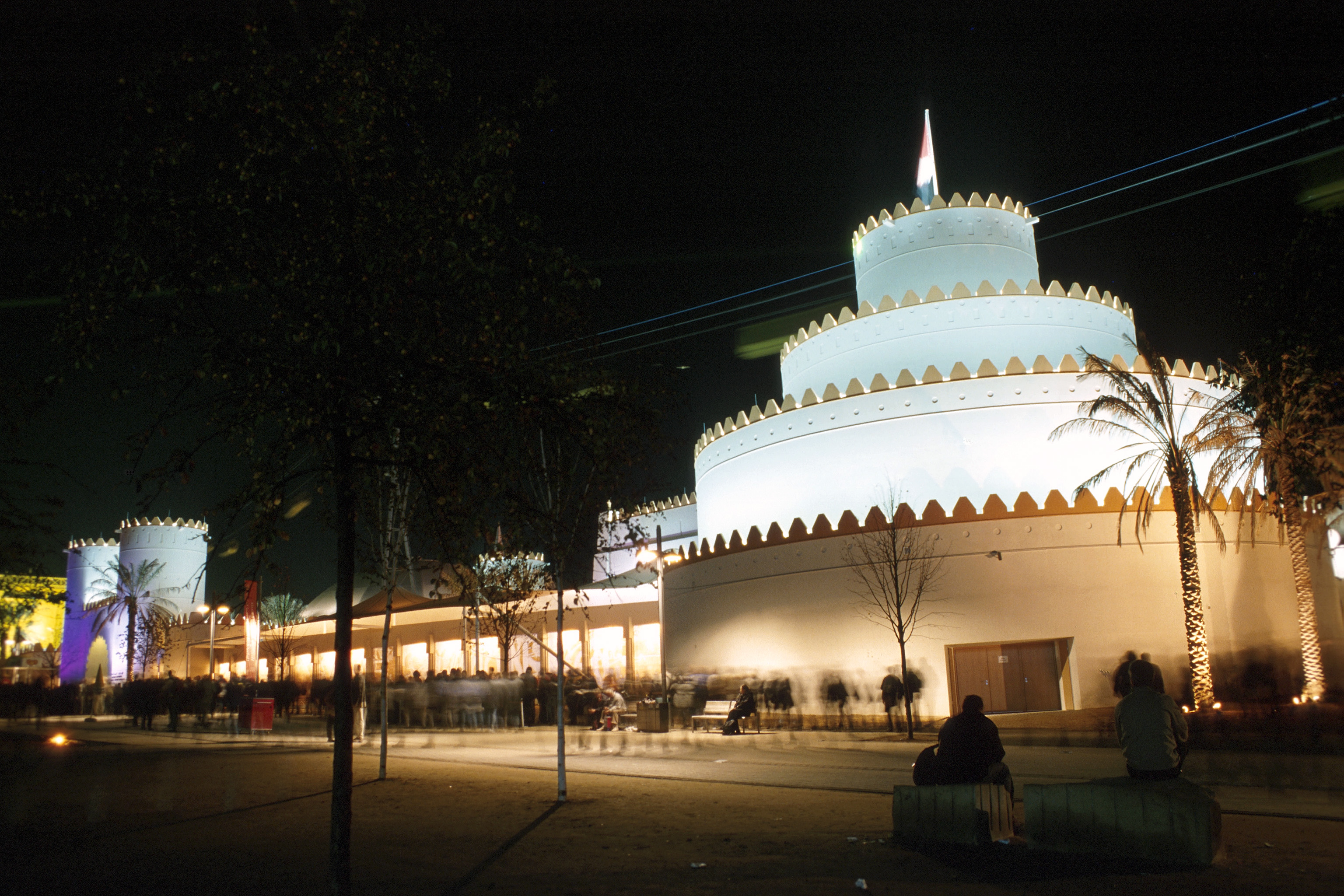
  United Arab Emirates pavilion
- United Arab Emirates – The 3000 m² pavilion, situated on a 6000 m² plot (the largest of the Expo sites), was a recreated desert fort. Designed by the French architect Alain Durand-Heriot, the exhibit tried to evoke the feeling of being in the Arab state. The main attraction was a 360° circular cinema. The building was 84 m × 36 m and built out of recyclable materials. The theme of the pavilion was "From the traditional to the modern" and presented the history of the country.
- Venezuela – The Venezuelan pavilion was a convertible tent structure which opened and closed like a flower. It was very lightweight, was constructed with no waste and completely re-usable. The flower petals were positioned according to the weather, to shade, keep dry or allow sun to shine on the pavilion. It was designed by Fruto Vivas and Frei Otto with SL Rasch.

=== Other ===
- Planet m – Media for Mankind – The Bertelsmann pavilion, designed by TRIAD Berlin, explored the importance of the media. Guests were brought to the exhibition by the world's largest elevator, which could transport up to 200 people at once. Today, the building is used by the University of Applied Sciences Hannover.
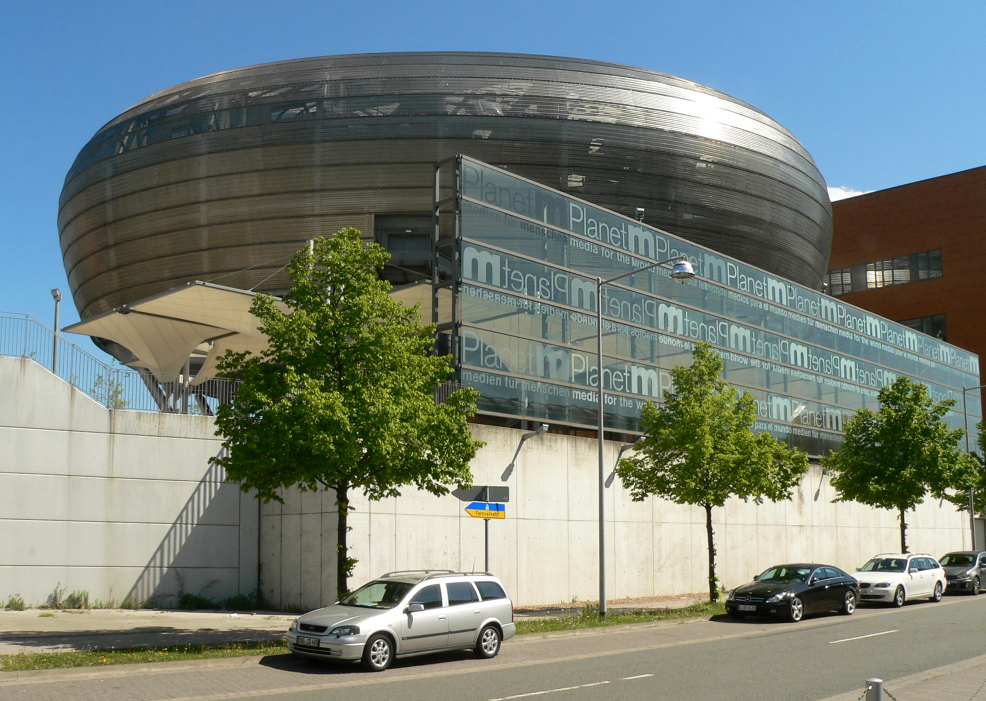
  Planet M pavilion
- BMW World – The exhibit focused on BMW's efforts to create clean-energy operated vehicles. The BMW 750hL Clean Energy car was on display. There were also exhibits on the possibilities of solar- and water-fueled cars. Daimler Chrysler also operated Lab.01, an interactive laboratory showcasing mobility devices including mini-robots.
- EU European Union – The pavilion presented the European Union's vision of Europe. The walk-through exhibit was divided into seven zones: 50's, Time Shuttle, Euro, Blue Planet, Bridge, Tunnel, Here and Now.
- Global House – The building housed the One World Cafe and a variety of exhibits, including Indigenous Peoples' Wisdom from the Earth, a display of 26 initiatives by indigenous groups from around the globe. Each initiative was shown in a flight case and featured text, images, and in many cases, contemporary handicraft. The exhibit was the first opportunity for indigenous people to represent themselves at a World Expo.
- WWF (World Wildlife Fund) – A cube-shaped pavilion designed by André Heller and Mathis Barz, with fossil cladding and a 14m tall "earth spirit" standing next to it. After the expo, structure was moved to the park of the Old Abbey in Mettlach.
- The ZERI Pavilion – ZERI (name of the Zero Emission Research Initiative) commissioned the largest bamboo structure of the expo, designed by Simón Vélez. It was built by 41 Colombian wood workers in less than three months. Over 4,500 bamboos (Guadua angustifolia) were joined to construct this building. Nine months of scientific research and testing first enabled the acquisition of a temporary permit, and after the building was constructed twice (once in Manizales, Colombia and once in Hanover), the final permit was granted the day before the opening of the Expo 2000. This pavilion presented seven projects from around the world to demonstrate that it is possible to respond to everyone's needs on Earth with what we have. The projects from Colombia, Zimbabwe, Fiji, Sweden and Japan inspired many young people. The ZERI Pavilion had an estimated 6.4 million visitors, but it had no doors and no queues.
- Christ Pavilion – a 2004 m^{2} modular pavilion of the Protestant and Catholic churches in Germany, reconstructed in 2001 at the monastery Volkenroda.

== Projects ==
- Lost Paradise Lost - art meets church
- Rain Forest House - hear, smell, taste and feel the diversity of the tropical highland rain forest
- Hannover Zoo - where the animals can live in conditions similar to their natural habitats
- Hornemann Institute - worldwide knowledge transfer as well as further education in the field of conservation and restoration
- Worlds Children Peace Monument (WCPM) - conceived during EXPO 2000's Culture on the Move segment in cooperation with the United Nations 2000 Culture of Peace Program. The WCPM project, still in use today, encourages positive community participation through the establishment of works of public art, through cultural education and entrepreneurial training to children around the World.

== Legacy ==
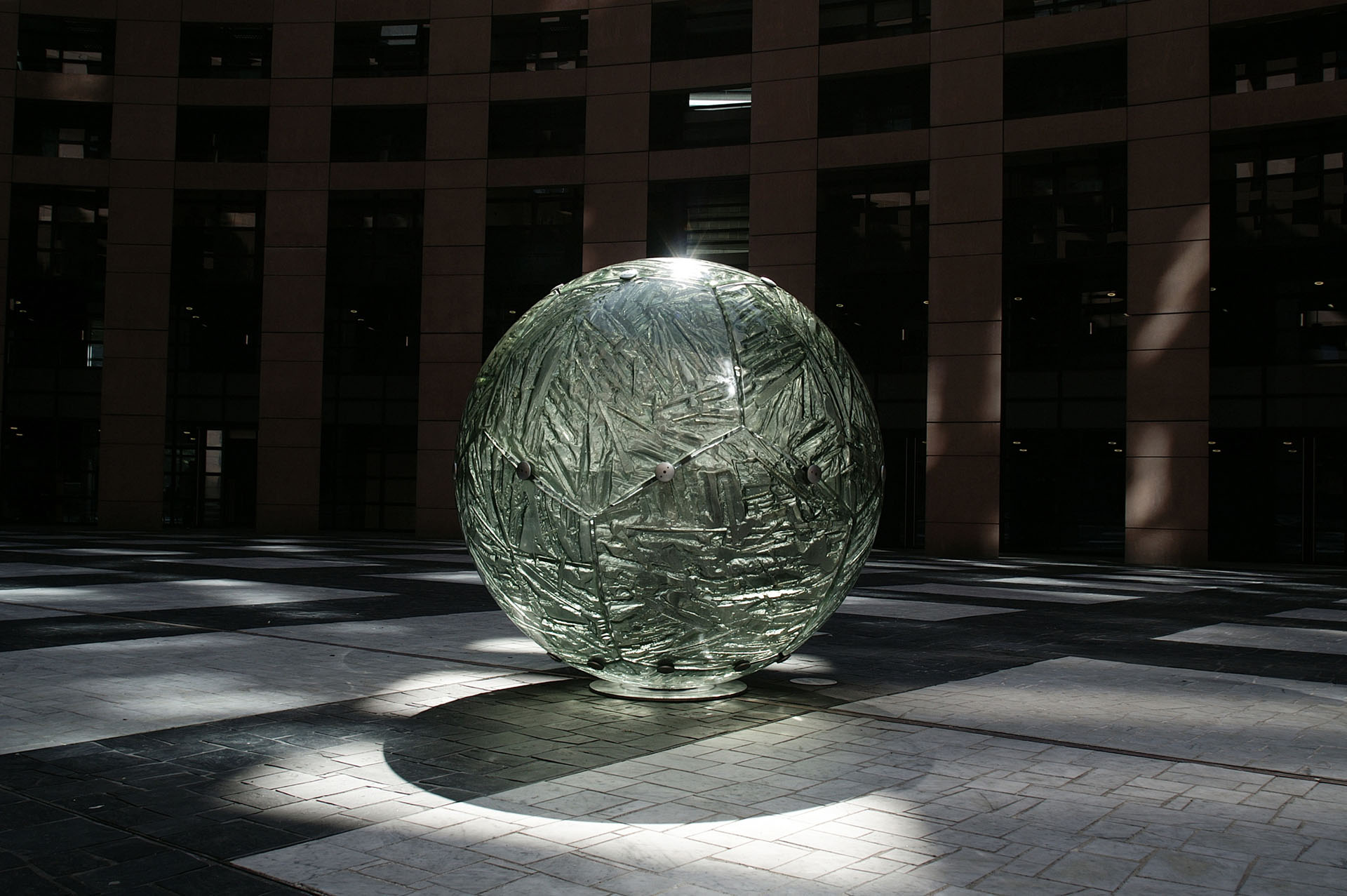
Glass sculpture "United Earth" by Tomasz Urbanowicz from EXPO 2000, rebuilt in the European Parliament in Strasbourg.

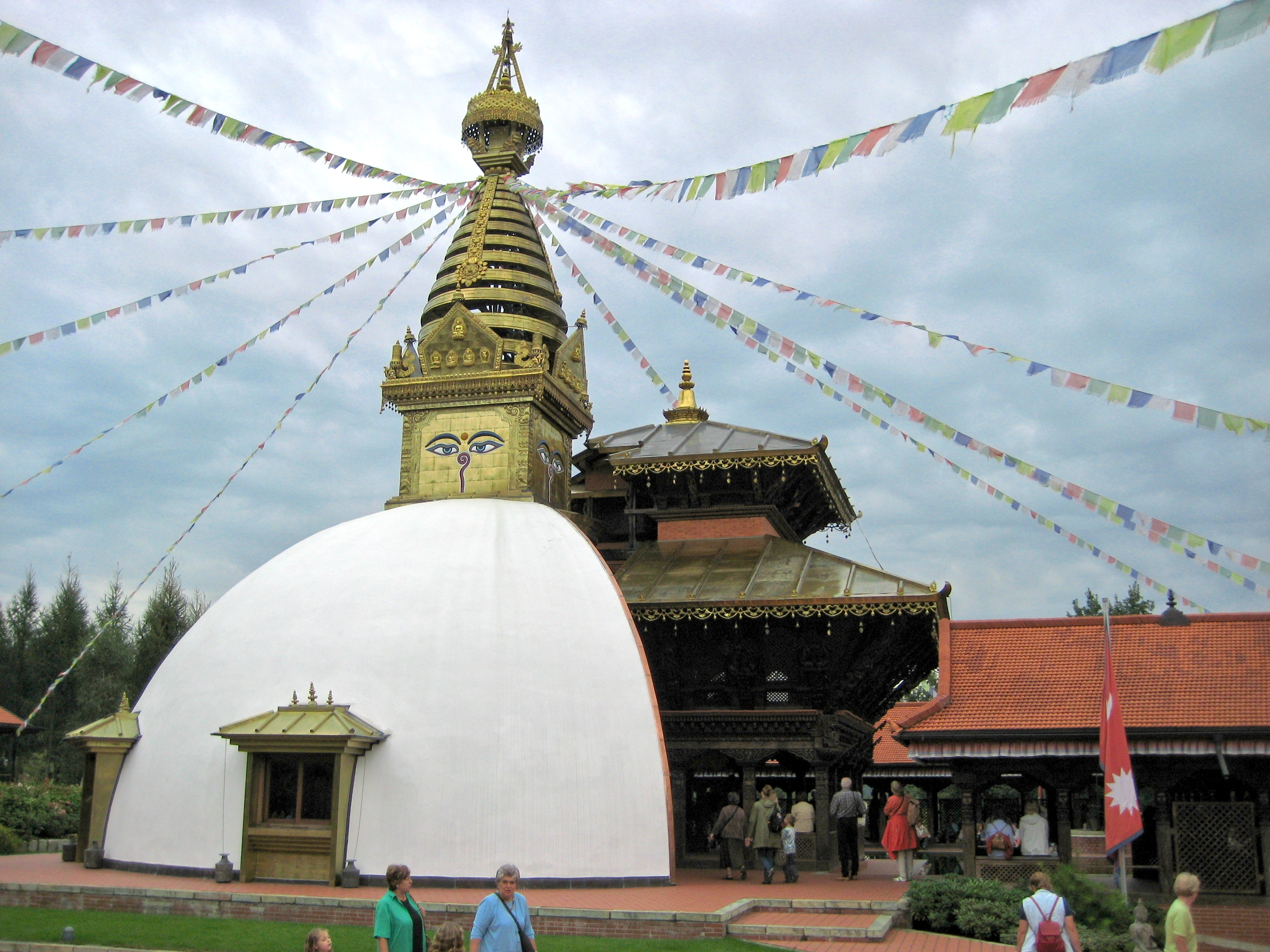
The Nepal Himalaya Pavilion from the Expo 2000, rebuilt with a small botanical garden at Wiesent near Regensburg

Some of the buildings on the Expo site were sold after EXPO 2000 ended, but most of the exhibition area is still used for major fairs in Germany, as it has been since 1949. The southeastern area around Expo Plaza has been turned into Hanover's new centre of information technology, design, media and arts.

Most of the national pavilion buildings were demolished, or disassembled and shipped to their home countries, following the Expo. Some buildings were retained, including the Netherlands Pavilion. The structure has now fallen into disrepair, until earlier in December 2017, when architecture company MVRDV announced plans to restore and renovate the Netherlands pavilion to accommodate future users.

A glass sculpture called "United Earth" by Tomasz Urbanowicz exhibited as part of the Lower Silesian Presentation in the Polish Pavilion was later handed over by the City of Wrocław to the European Parliament in Strasbourg. The sculpture is the main central point of the Agora of the Louise Weiss building designed by Architecture-Studio.

== Gallery ==
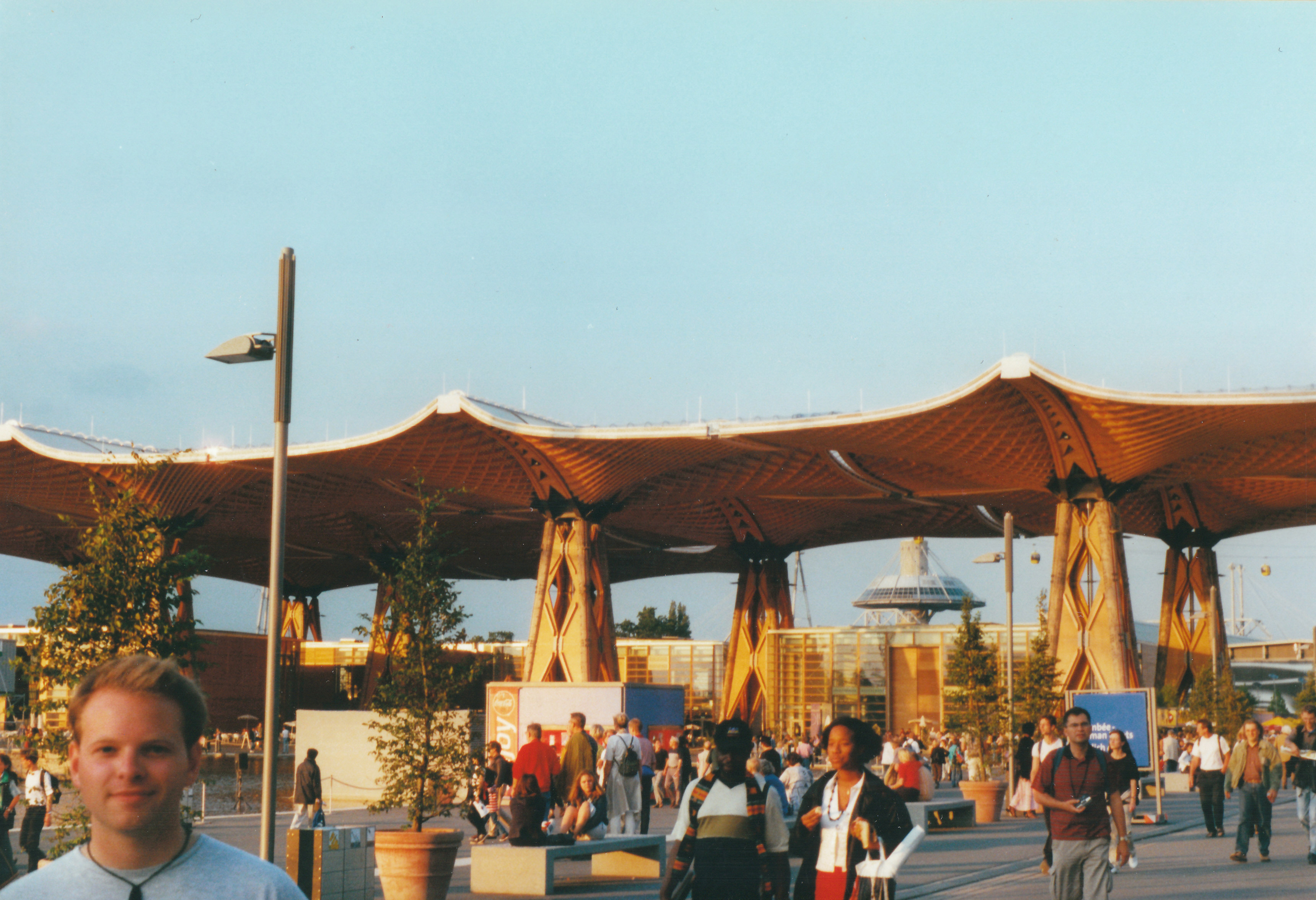
Wooden roof structure at the expo

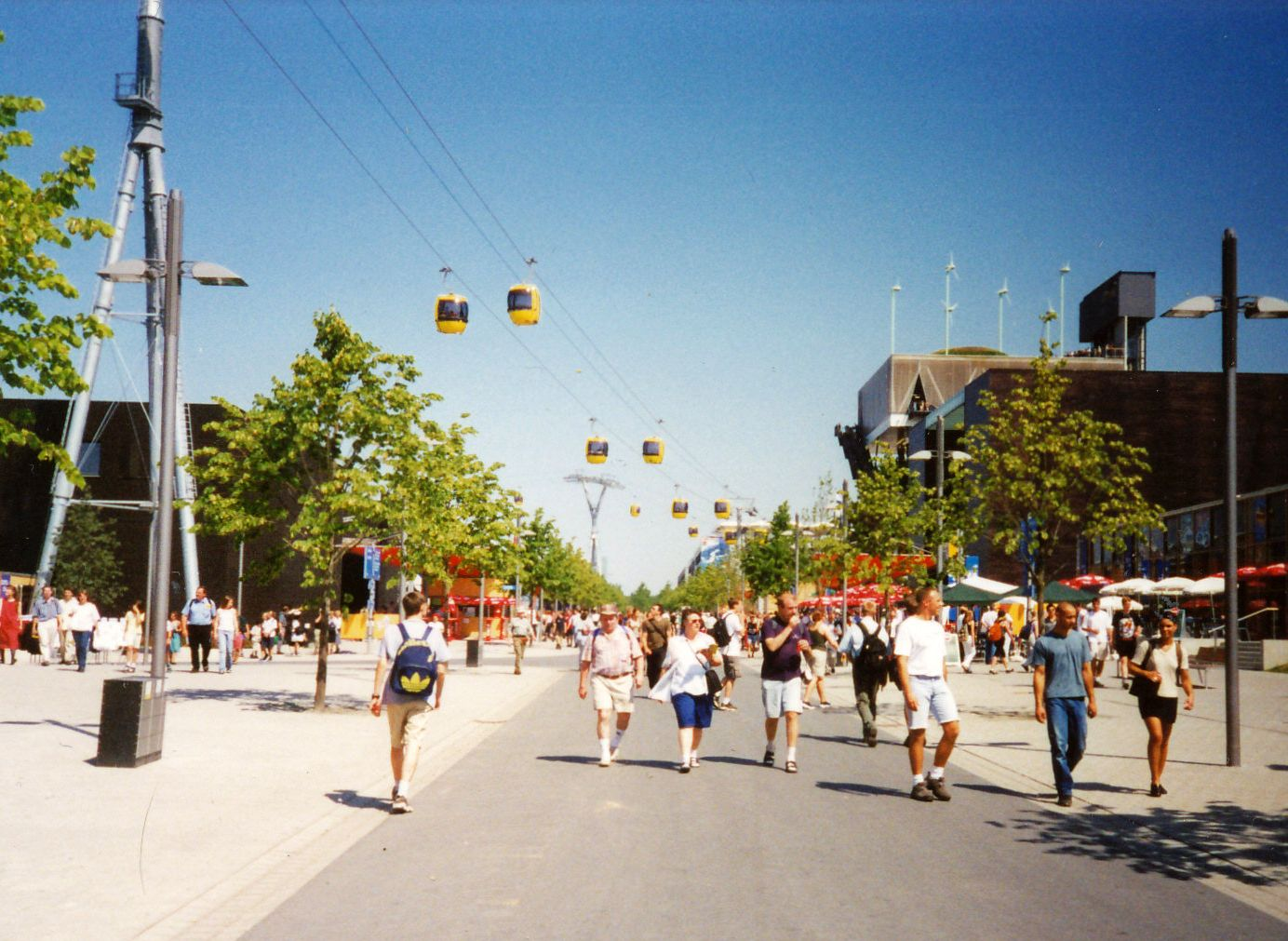
The expo boulevard with cableway above

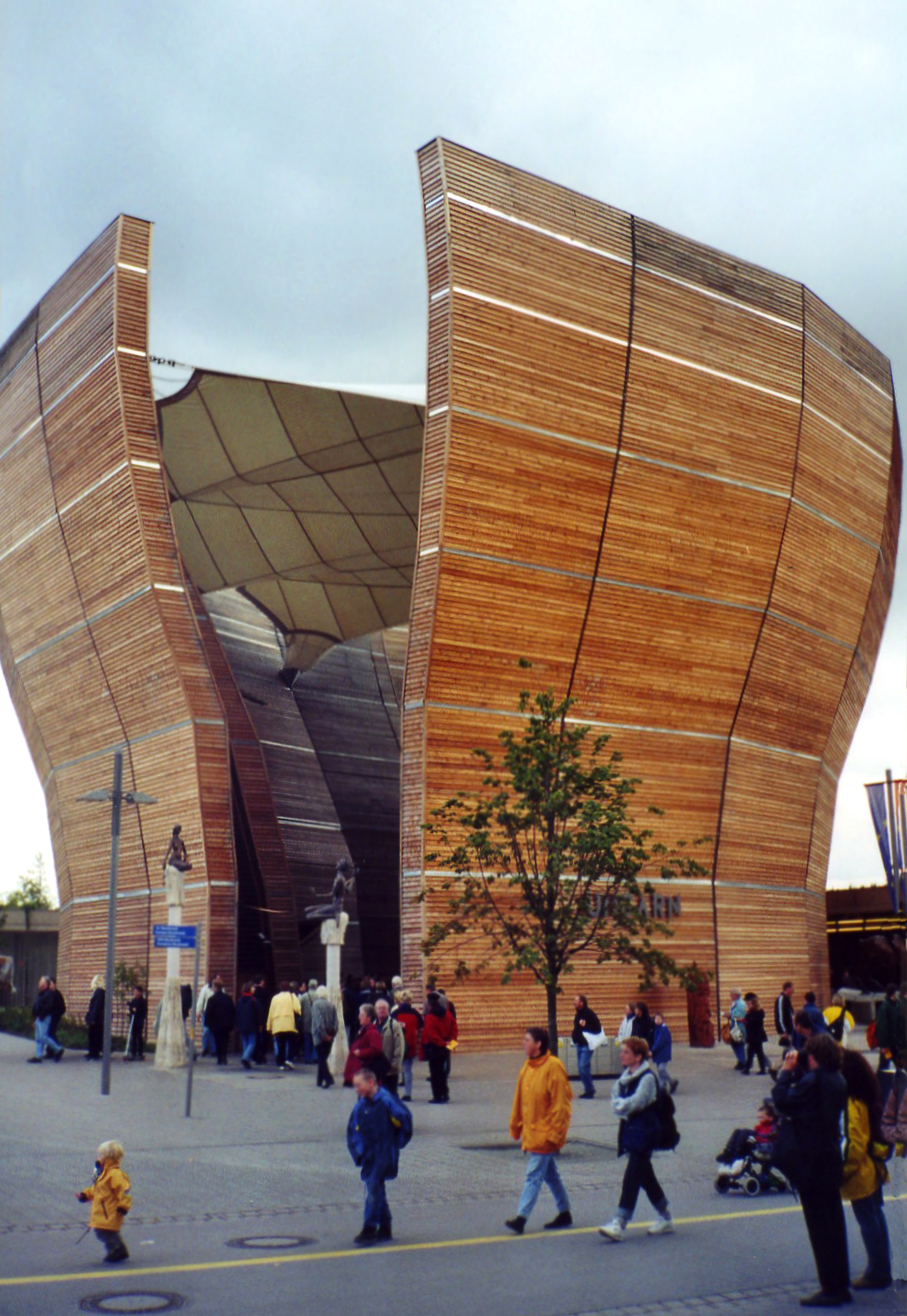
Hungary pavilion

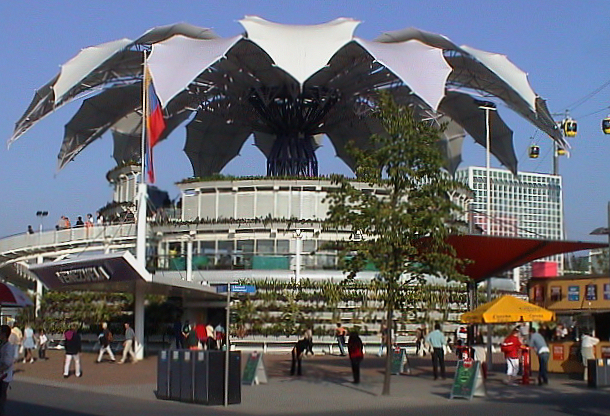
Venezuelan pavilion

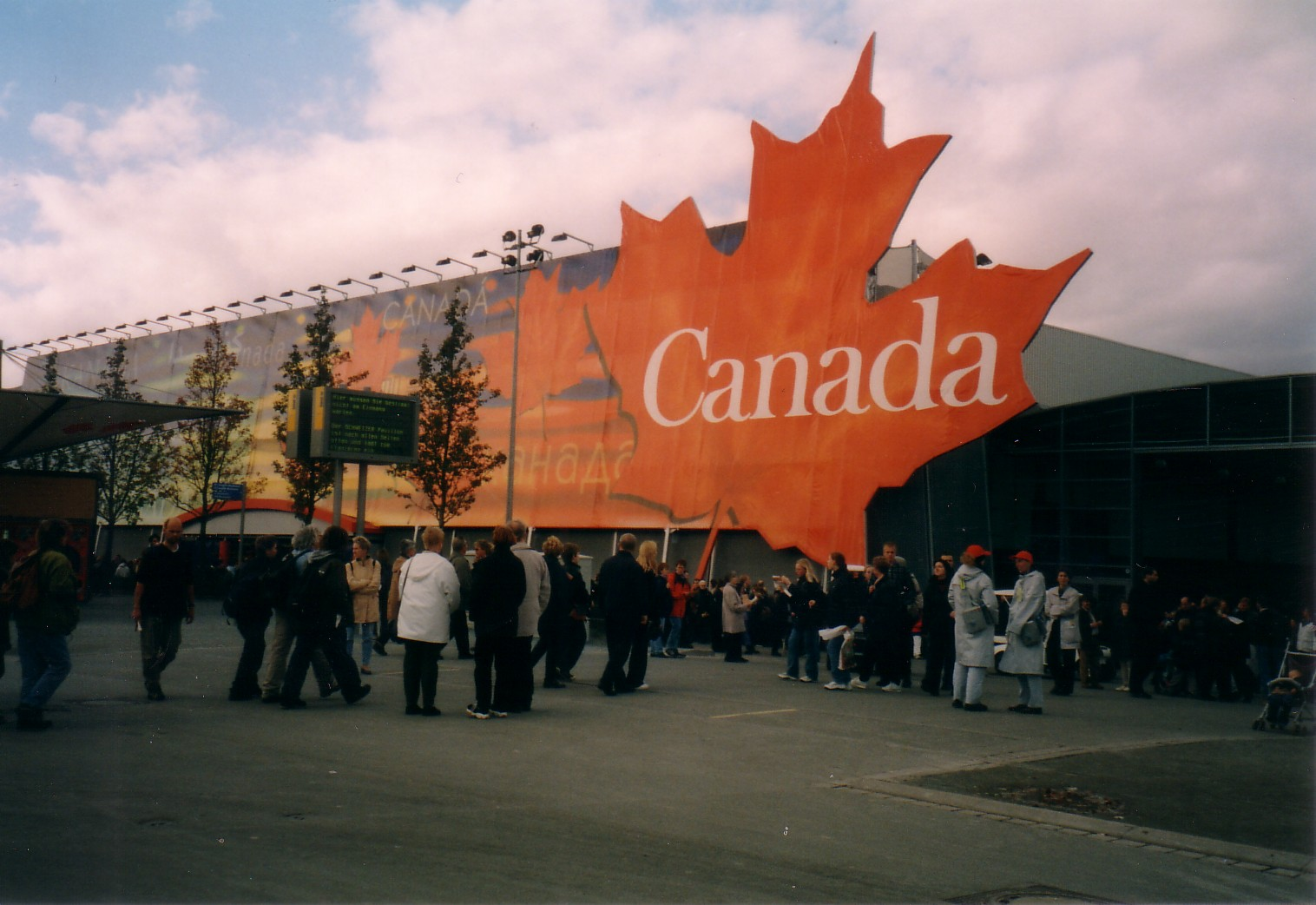
Canadian pavilion

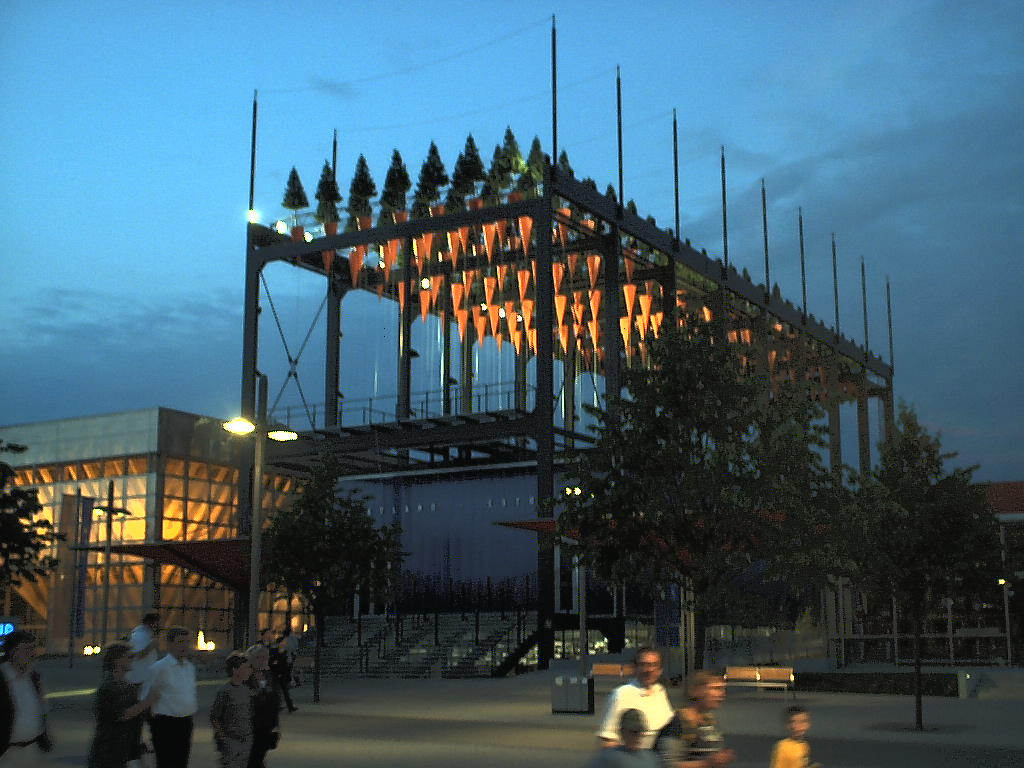
Estonian pavilion

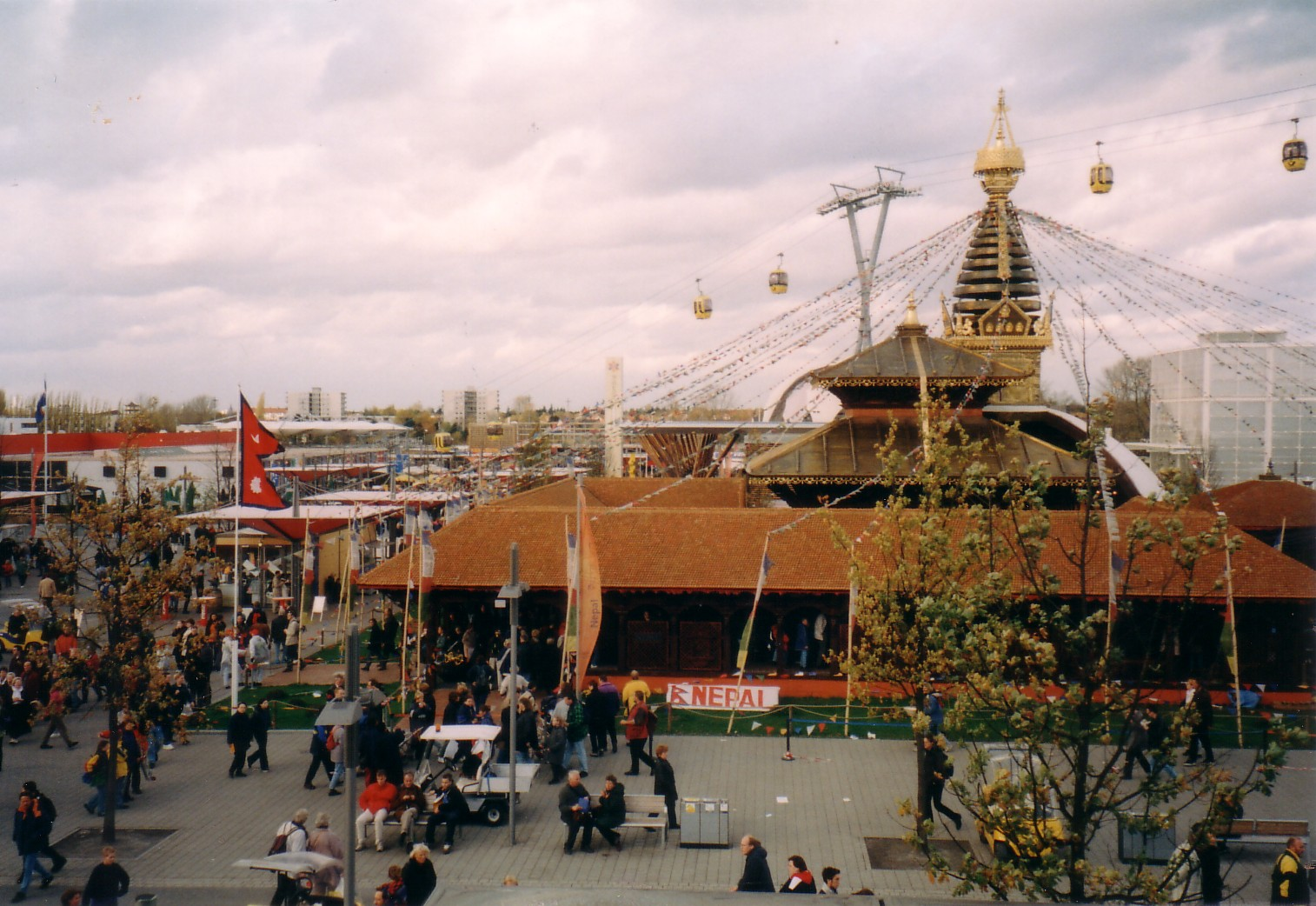
Pavilion of Nepal

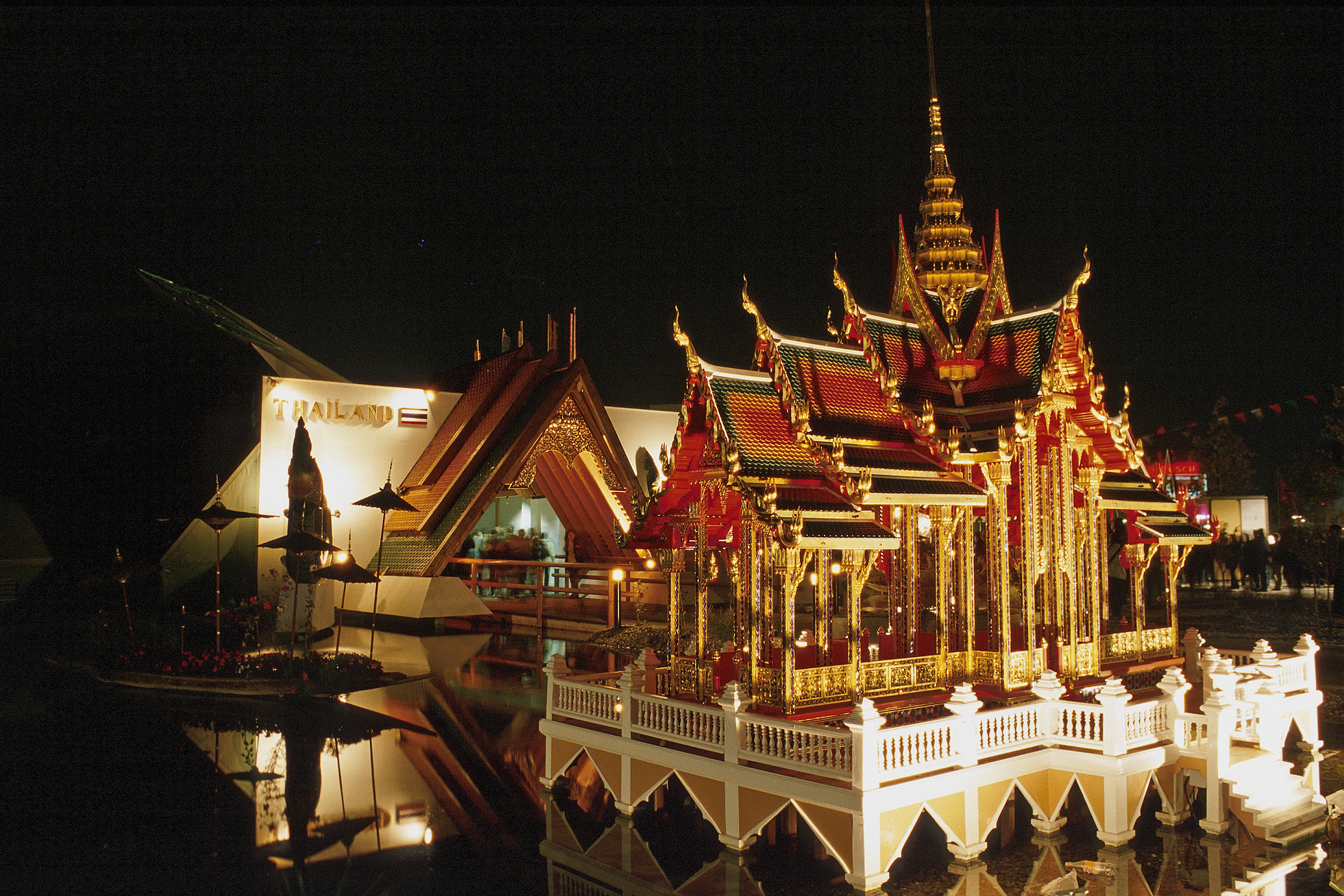
Thai pavilion

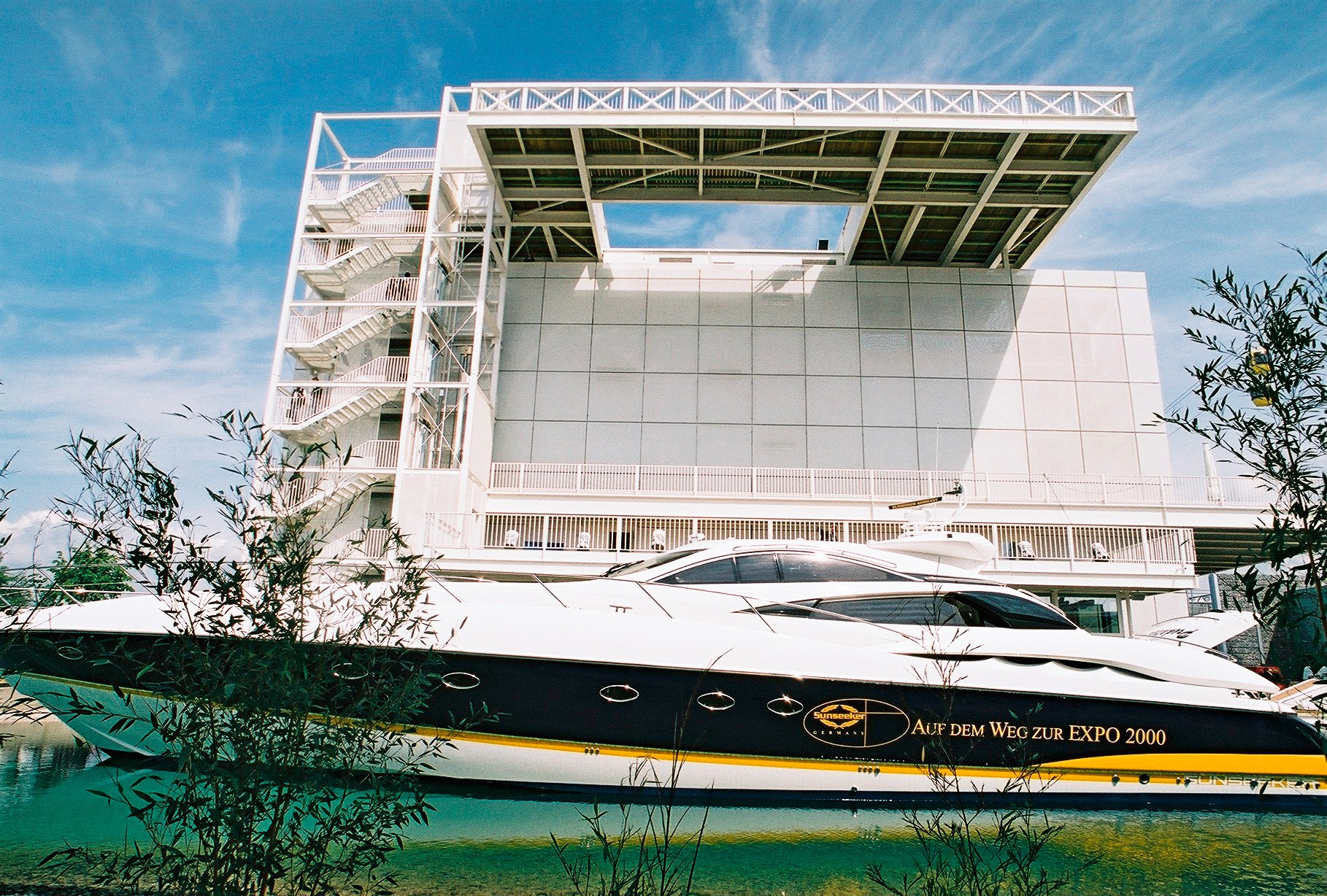
Monaco pavilion

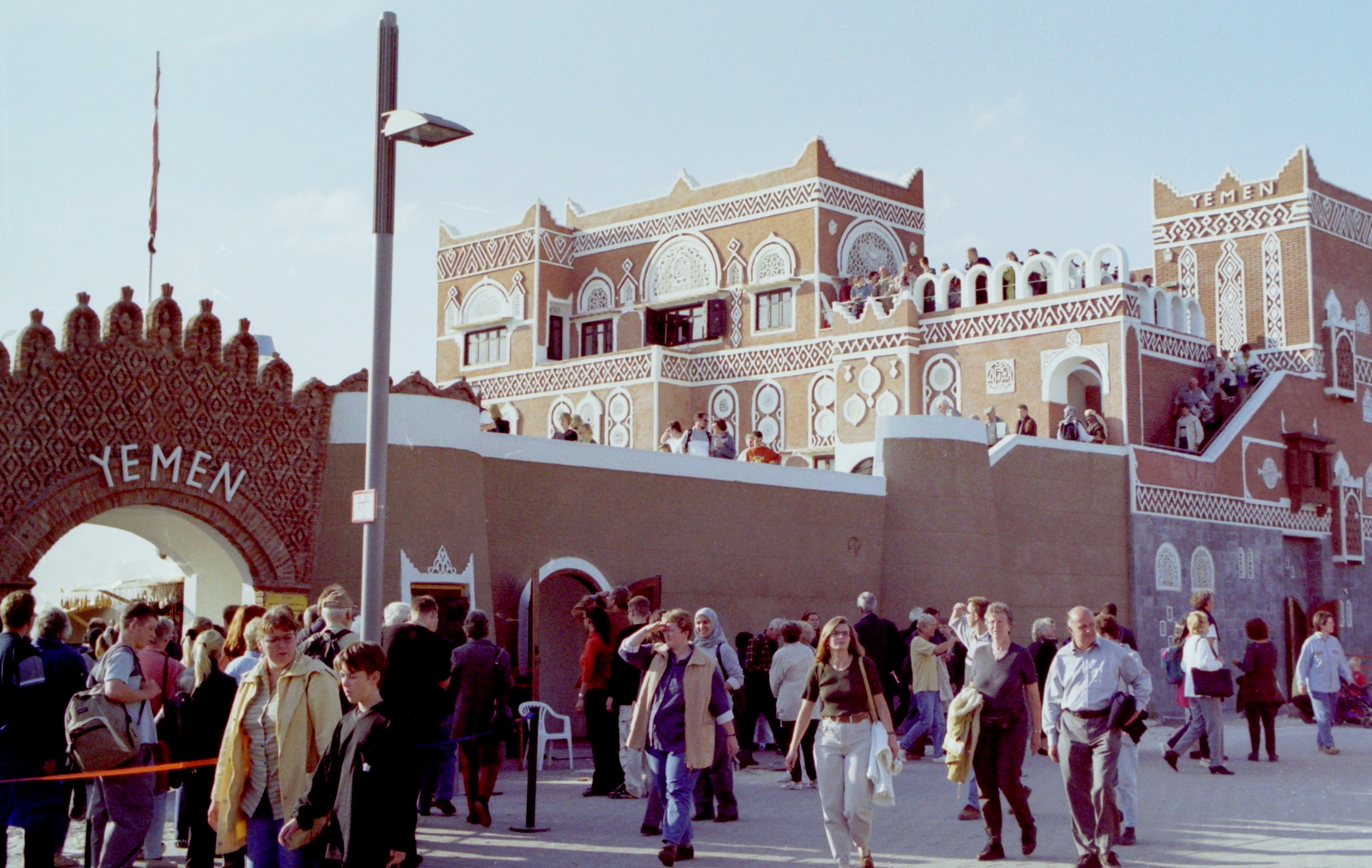
Yemen pavilion

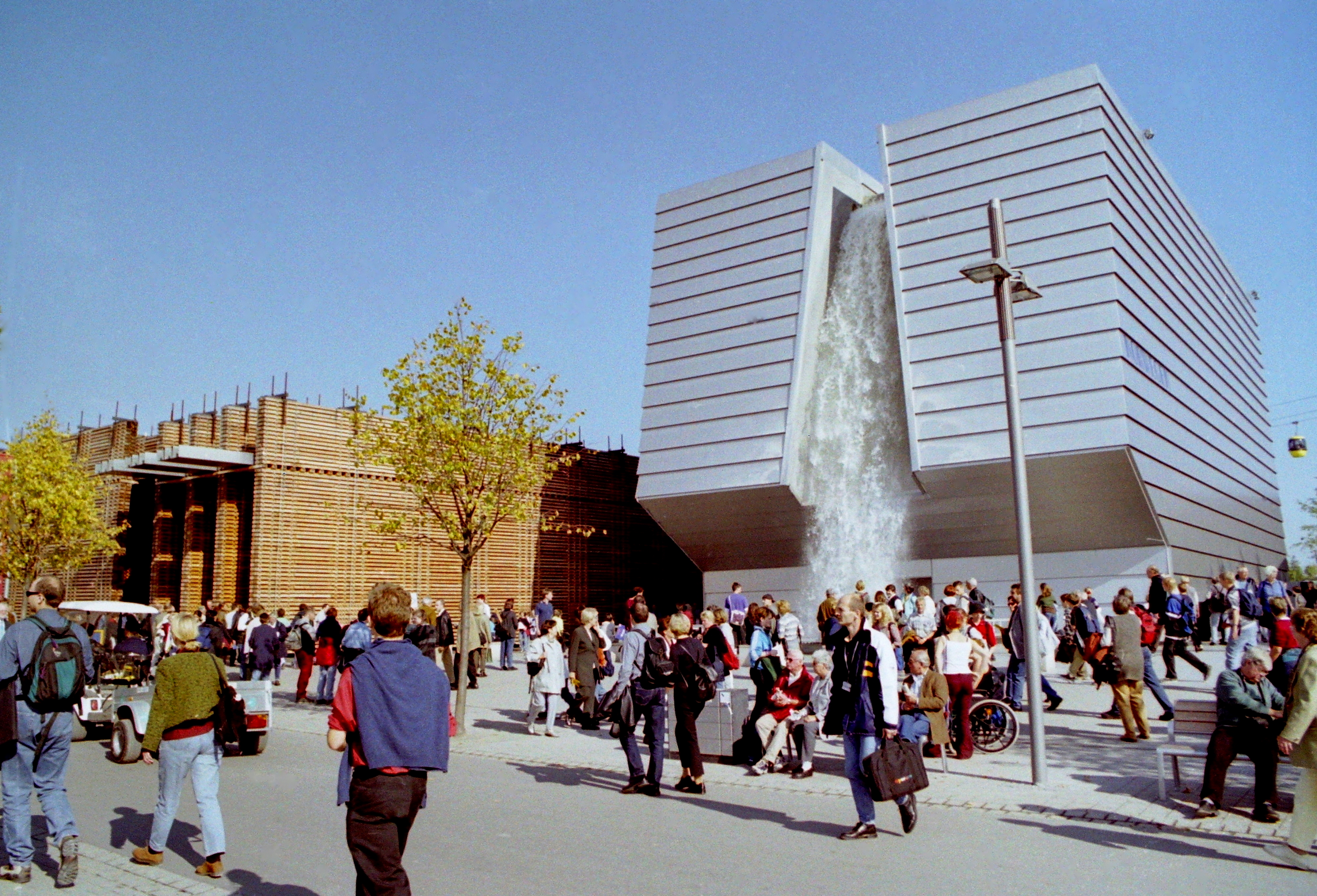
Norwegian pavilion

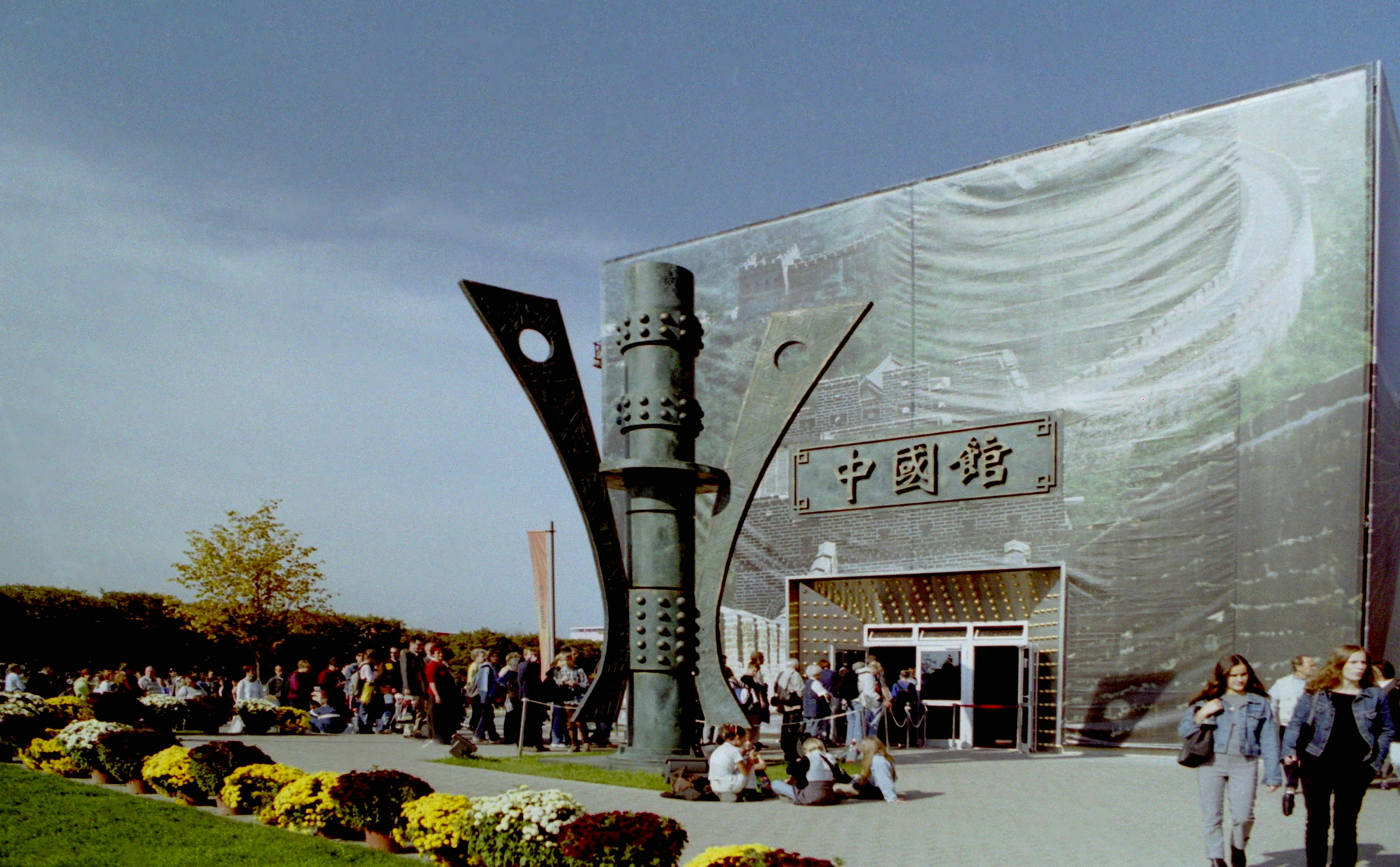
Chinese pavilion

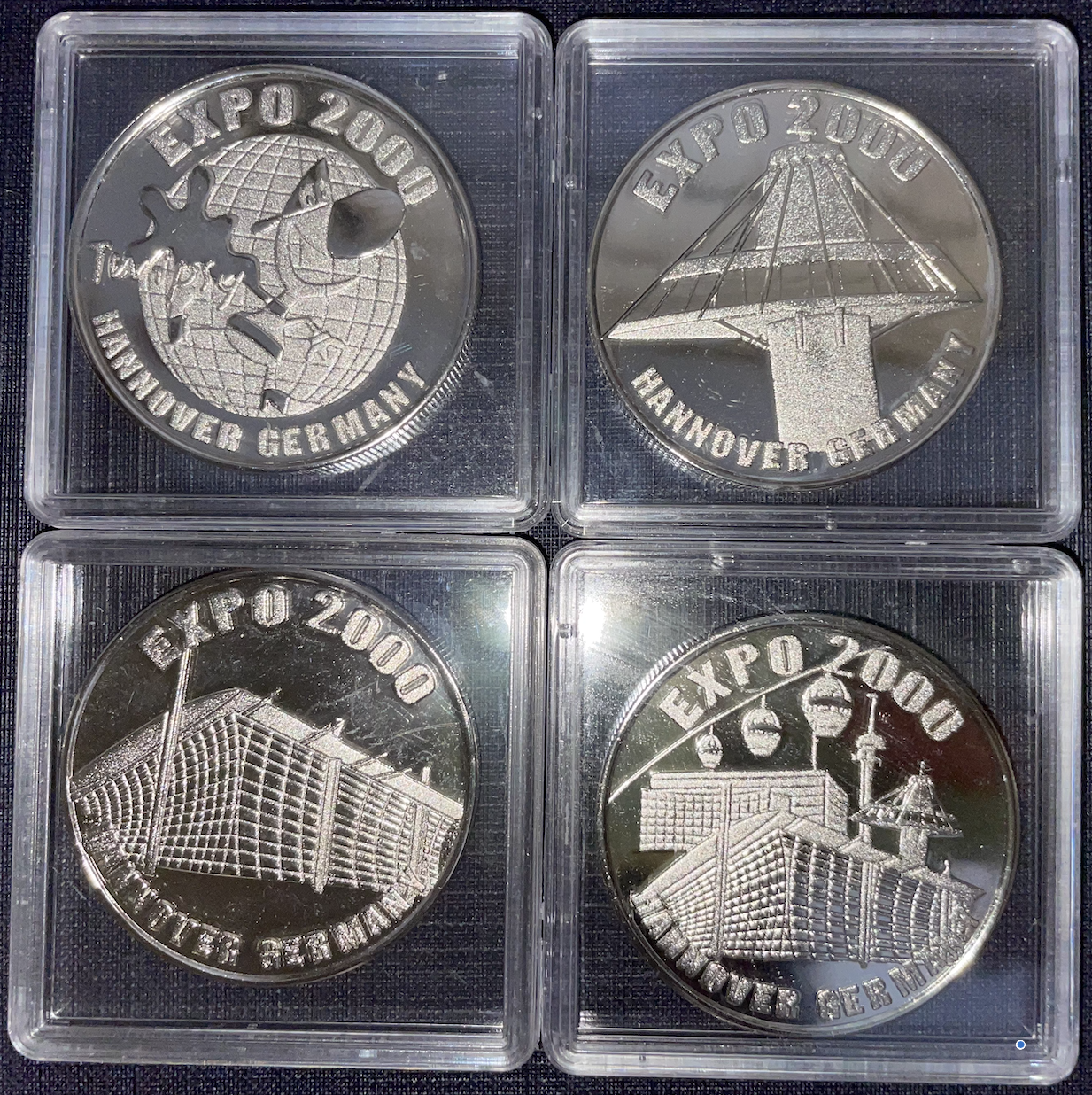
Commemorative medallions of the expo

== See also ==
- Hannover Principles
