= Hornemann Institute =

German-based research institute

- Named after: Friedrich Hornemann
- Founded: 1998
- Type: Education and Research
- Location: Hildesheim, Lower Saxony, Germany
- Coordinates: 52.1461°N 9.9558°E
- Owner: University of Applied Sciences und Arts Hildesheim/Holzminden/Göttingen (HAWK)
- Website: hornemann-institut.de

The Hornemann Institute - Centre of the Preservation of World Cultural Heritage was founded in December 1998 and registered as official project for the German world exhibition EXPO 2000 "World Cultural Heritage - A Global Challenge". Since 2003 the Hornemann Institute is state-funded institute of the University of Applied Sciences und Arts Hildesheim/Holzminden/Göttingen (HAWK). The institute's primary field of activity focuses on worldwide knowledge transfer and further education in the field of conservation and restoration with new media.

== History ==
The Hornemann Institute was founded in 1998 and initially held by the “Verein zur Bewahrung und Erhaltung des Weltkulturerbes e.V.” (Association for the Preservation and Conservation of World Cultural Heritage) until 2003, in cooperation with the City of Hildesheim, the University of Applied Sciences und Arts Hildesheim/Holzminden/Göttingen and the University of Hildesheim.

Since September 2003, the institute is part of the University of Applied Sciences und Arts Hildesheim/Holzminden/Göttingen and the association is still a supporting body to the Hornemann Institute. The institute was named after the first German explorer of Africa, Friedrich Konrad Hornemann, who was born in Hildesheim in 1772.

The Hornemann Institute has been a partner of ENCoRE ENCoRE = European Network for Conservation-Restoration Education) since 2011 and a member of the „German Initiative for Network Information“ (DINI) since 2009.

== Areas of Activity ==
The Institute focuses on the dissemination of knowledge and further education in the field of conservation and restoration by new and traditional media.

=== E-Publications ===
With the free of charge E-Publications of the Hornemann Institute (university papers, conference papers, essays, project documentations, videos and posters), the institute promotes the exchange of information for quick and uncomplicated publication and research. In cooperation with the Technische Informationsbibliothek Hannover (TIB), the institute uses Digital Object Identifier as a permanent and reliable reference for deposited data. In addition, the Hornemann Institute runs a Wikipedia-like information platform which offers access to new research and questions of practice on salt and salt-related decay of monuments and objects.

=== E-Learning ===
For more than 25 years, the Hornemann Institute has been developing E-learning courses in the field of preservation of cultural heritage in cooperation with the teaching staff of the HAWK. The courses comprise hundreds of pictures from conservation practice and varied possibilities for testing your knowledge. All participants can contact the tutor to clarify questions about the course materials and their practical implementation. Upon successful completion participants receive a certificate of qualification. Some courses can be credited for the study at the HAWK.

=== Publication Series ===
The publication series (ISSN 2193-1917) has 24 volumes up to now with a special focus on the cultural history of the Hildesheim region.

=== Conferences ===
The institute has been organizing conferences and workshops on the significance of cultural heritage and its preservation.

=== Cultural Heritage in Hildesheim ===
In addition, the Hornemann Institute supports research on cultural heritage sites in the Hildesheim region which has been presented in its publication series, e.g. on St. Michael's Church, Hildesheim (vol. 2), the Kaiserhaus in Hildesheim (vol. 1) as well as churches (vol. 4) and town halls in Lower Saxony (vol. 6). The Hornemann Institute also developed educational materials and "Heritage Cases" on the Hildesheimer World Heritage Site to increase the awareness of heritage preservation among children.

== Publications ==
=== Publications about the Institute and its Projects ===
- Angela Weyer: Das Hornemann-Institut – Ziele und Projekte/The Hornemann Institute – Aims and Projects. In: Das Kaiserhaus in Hildesheim. Renaissance in Niedersachsen. Hildesheim 2000, p. 115-125 (=Schriften der Hornemann Instituts 1).
- Erwin Wager: Increasing the Net of Knowledge: About Visions and Steps towards the Hornemann Institute. In: Annamaria Geiger, Arne Eggebrecht (eds.): World Cultural Heritage - A Global Challenge- Hildesheim 1997, p. 222-223.
- Angela Weyer: hericare: Dokumentationssoftware und Online-Datenbank zur Erhaltung von Kulturerbe / Documentation Software and Online-Database for the Preservation of Cultural Heritage. In: Elektronische Bildverarbeitung & Kunst, Kultur, Historie – Konferenzband, November 14.-16., 2001, am Berliner Kulturforum. Berlin 2001, p. 249-250.
- Cord Brune, Angela Weyer: NEW: Conservation records on the Internet. In: Proceedings of the EC Conference Cultural Heritage Research: a Pan-European Challenge: May 16–18, 2002, Cracow, Poland. Krakau / Luxemburg 2003, p. 404.
- Barbara Hentschel, Angela Weyer: Internetbasierte Fortbildungskurse für Kulturschützer. In: Elektronische Bildverarbeitung & Kunst, Kultur, Historie – Konferenzband EVA 2003 Berlin, November 12.-14., 2003 am Berliner Kulturforum, Berlin 2003, p. 98-100.
- Angela Weyer, Cord Brune: Internet-based training courses for conservators. In: Conservation Education - Changing Environment, Proceedings of the Interim Meeting of the ICOM-CC Education and Training Working Group, October 1–3, 2004, EVTEK Institute of Art and Design, Vantaa, Finland, Tannar Ruuben (ed.), p. 85-90.
- Barbara Hentschel, Thomas Kittel, Angela Weyer: Lernen via Internet: Internetbasierte Fortbildungskurse am Hornemann Institut. In: Restauro 1/2005, p. 6-10.
- Barbara Hentschel, Angela Weyer: Internet-based training modules for conservators. In: CHRESP Cultural Heritage Research Meets Practice, 8th European Conference on Research for Protection, Conservation and Enhancement of Cultural Heritage, 10 to 12 November 2008, Ljubljana, Slovenia 2008, p. 271-271
- Hans-Jürgen Schwarz: Fachwiki „Schäden durch Salze. In: 87. Tagung der Deutschen Mineralogischen Gesellschaft, 13.-16.09.2009, (= Hallesches Jahrbuch für Geowissenschaften 31), Halle 2009, p. 230.
- Hans-Jürgen Schwarz, Angela Weyer: SalzWiki – A new tool for knowledge transfer and research: A specialized Wiki and Repository on the subject “Salt Decay”. Vortrag CRYSPOM II: Crystallisation in Porous Media, June 15–18, 2010, in Brienz (CH), Abstracts, Brionez 2009, p. 37, .
- Hans-Jürgen Schwarz, Angela Weyer: SalzWiki und SaltWiki – zwei neue, Wikipedia ähnliche Internetplattformen mit virtueller Forschungsumgebung zum Thema „Salzschäden an Kulturgütern“. In: Bausubstanz. Nr. 1, 2012, p. 54–58.
- Angela Weyer, Pilar Roig Picazo, Daniel Pop, JoAnn Cassar, Aysun Özköse and Ivan Srša (Hrsg.): EwaGlos - European Illustrated Glossary of Conservation Terms for Wall Paintings and Architectural Surfaces, English definitions with translations into Bulgarian, Croatian, French, German, Hungarian, Italian, Polish, Romanian, Spanish and Turkish :Schriften des Hornemann Instituts. Band 17). Petersberg 2015, ISBN 978-3-7319-0260-7, p. 12–22.
- Angela Weyer, Kerstin Klein, Barbara Hentschel (2017): Sgraffito-Tagung an der HAWK in Hildesheim im November 2017 - eine Nachlese. doi:10.5165/hawk-hhg/384.
- Weyer, Angela (2019). "Zur Behebung der Klimaprobleme in Kirchen. Die Ausstattung im Fokus: Tagungsbericht zur interdisziplinären Denkmalpflegetagung "Klimazone Kirche" der HAWK in Hildesheim im Januar 2019". Restauro (in German) (4): 44–51. doi:10.5165/hawk-hhg/403.
- Angela Weyer: International und regional aktiv: Das Hornemann Institut. In: Angela Weyer, Ursula Schädler-Saub (Hrsg.): Aus Rot wird Schwarz – und dann? Pigmentveränderungen an Kunst- und Kulturgut. Interdisziplinäre Tagung des Hornemann Instituts der HAWK Hochschule für angewandte Wissenschaft und Kunst Hildesheim/Holzminden/Göttingen anlässlich seines 25-jährigen Jubiläums in Kooperation mit der AG Konservierung – Restaurierung von ICOMOS und dem Verband der Restauratoren e. V., 9. November 2023 (= Schriften des Hornemann Instituts 24), Berlin 2024, S. 175-195

=== Publication Series of the Hornemann Institute ===
- Annamaria Geiger, Arne Eggebrecht (eds.): World Cultural Heritage - A Global Challenge. Documentation on the International Symposium in Hildesheim/Germany 23.02.-01.03.1997, Hildesheim 1997, ISBN 978-3-9813856-5-6
- Vol. 1: Angela Weyer (ed.): Das Kaiserhaus in Hildesheim. Renaissance in Niedersachsen, Hildesheim 2000, ISBN 978-3-8067-8593-7.
- Vol. 2: Christiane Segers-Glocke, Angela Weyer (eds.): Der Kreuzgang von St. Michael in Hildesheim. 1000 Jahre Kulturgeschichte in Stein. Katalog der Ausstellung Hildesheim, St. Michael 1.7. - 2.10.2000, Hameln 2000, ISBN 978-3-8271-8020-9.
- Vol. 3: Rettung des Kulturerbes – Projekte rund ums Mittelmeer. Katalog der Ausstellung, Hildesheim, Roemer- und Pelizeaus-Museum 18.06. - 29.10.2000, Hamburg 2000, ISBN 978-3-87261-091-1.
- Saving Cultural Heritage - Sauvetage du Patrimoine Culturel. Katalog zur Wanderausstellung (2001–2002), Eds.: Stadt Hildesheim und Hornemann Institut als Beauftragte des MEDA-Projekts EXPO 2000, Hildesheim 2001, ISBN 978-3-9813856-2-5
- Vol. 4: Ursula Schädler-Saub: Mittelalterliche Kirchen in Niedersachsen – Wege der Erhaltung und Restaurierung, Petersberg 2003, ISBN 978-3-932526-85-5.
- Vol. 5: Matthias Exner, Ursula Schädler-Saub (eds.): Die Restaurierung der Restaurierung? Zum Umgang mit Wandmalereien und Architekturfassungen des Mittelalters im 19. und 20. Jahrhundert, München 2002.
- Vol. 6: Ursula Schädler-Saub, Angela Weyer (eds.): Mittelalterliche Rathäuser in Niedersachsen und Bremen. Geschichte – Kunst – Erhaltung, Petersberg 2003, ISBN 978-3-937251-11-0.
- Vol. 7: Angela Weyer (ed.): Klasse Welterbe! Hildesheimer Weltkulturerbe im Unterricht, Hildesheim 2006, ISBN 978-3-9813856-3-2.
- Vol. 8: Kirsten Schönfelder und Elske Randow: Koffer zum UNESCO-Welterbe in der Dombibliothek Hildesheim. Handreihung für Multiplikatoren, Hildesheim 2008.
- Vol. 9: Kirsten Schönfelder (ed.): Koffer zum UNESCO-Weltkulturerbe St. Michael in Hildesheim. Handreichung für Multiplikatoren, Hildesheim 2008.
- Vol. 10: Ursula Schädler-Saub (ed.): Weltkulturerbe Deutschland - Präventive Konservierung und Erhaltungsperspektiven. Internationales Symposium 23.-25. November 2006 in Hildesheim, Regensburg 2008, ISBN 978-3-7954-2137-3.
- Vol. 11: Iveta Cerna, Ivo Hammer (ed.): Materiality. Tagungsakten des Internationalen Symposiums 27.- 29. April 2006 in Brünn/Tschechien, Brünn 2008, ISBN 978-80-86549-54-5.
- Vol. 12: Ursula Schädler-Saub, Angela Weyer (eds.): Theory and Practice in the Conservation of Modern and Contemporary Art. Tagungsakten des Internationalen Symposiums, 13. -14. Januar 2009 in Hildesheim, London 2010, ISBN 978-1-904982-54-8.
- Vol. 13: Thomas Brachert: Nachträge und Corrigenda zum "Lexikon historischer Maltechniken Quellen - Handwerk - Technologie - Alchemie". Hildesheim 2010, ISBN 978-3-9813856-4-9.
- Vol. 14: Gerhard Lutz, Angela Weyer (ed.):1000 Jahre St. Michael in Hildesheim. Kirche – Kloster – Stifter, Petersberg 2012, ISBN 978-3-86568-767-8
- Vol. 15: Nicole Riedl (Hrsg.):Weltkulturerbe Konstantinbasilika Trier. Wandmalerei in freier Bewitterung als konservatorische Herausforderung, Berlin 2013, ISBN 978-3-930388-80-6.
- Vol. 16: Ursula Schädler-Saub, Angela Weyer (ed.): Geteilt – Vereint! Denkmalpflege in Mitteleuropa zur Zeit des Eisernen Vorhangs und heute, Petersberg 2015, ISBN 978-3-7319-0157-0.
- Vol. 17: Angela Weyer, Pilar Roig Picazo, Daniel Pop, JoAnn Cassar, Aysun Özköse, Jean-Marc Vallet, Ivan Srša (ed.): EwaGlos - European Illustrated Glossary of Conservation Terms for Wall Paintings and Architectural Surfaces. English definitions with translations into Bulgarian, Croatian, French, German, Hungarian, Italian, Polish, Romanian, Petersberg 2015, ISBN 978-3-7319-0260-7.
- Vol. 18: Konsolidieren und Kommunizieren. Materialien und Methoden zur Konsolidierung von Kunst- und Kulturgut im interdisziplinären Dialog, Petersberg 2018, ISBN 978-3-7319-0656-8.
- Vol. 19: Angela Weyer, Kerstin Klein (ed.): Sgraffito im Wandel - Sgraffito in Change. Materialien, Techniken, Themen und Erhaltung - Materials, Techniques, Topics, and Preservation, Petersberg 2019, ISBN 978-3-7319-0802-9
- Vol. 20: Ina Birkenbeul, Angela Weyer (ed.): Klimazone Kirche. Präventive Konservierung der Ausstattung, Berlin 2019, ISBN 978-3-945880-50-0
- Vol. 21: Ursula Schädler-Saub, Angela Weyer (ed.): Klimazone Kirche. Das Fragment im Digitalen Zeitalter / The Fragment in the Digital Age. Möglichkeiten und Grenzen neuer Techniken in der Restaurierung / Opportunities and limitations of new conservation-restoration techniques, Berlin 2021, ISBN 978-3-94588-06-92
- Vol. 22: Ursula Schädler-Saub und Mechthild Noll-Minor (ed.): Nicht-invasiv! Neue Perspektiven in der Erforschung und Restaurierung von Wandmalerei dank digitaler Techniken Der Wandmalereizyklus zu den Wissenschaften und Künsten in der Brandenburger Domklausur und weitere Fallbeispiele. Begleitbuch zur internationalen Tagung der HAWK Hochschule Hildesheim/Holzminden/Göttingen (Fakultät Bauen und Erhalten und Hornemann Institut) in Kooperation mit dem Brandenburgischen Landesamt für Denkmalpflege und Archäologisches Landesmuseum sowie dem Domstift Brandenburg, Brandenburg an der Havel, 27.-30. April 2022, Berlin 2022.
- Vol. 23: Gerhard Lutz und Angela Weyer (ed.): 850 Jahre St. Godehard in Hildesheim. Interdisziplinäre Tagung des Hornemann Institut der HAWK und der Klosterkammer Hannover in Kooperation mit dem Bistum Hildesheim im Rahmen des Festprogramms zu 1000 Jahre Bischof Godehard, HAWK in Hildesheim, 19. - 21. September 2022, Petersberg 2023.
- Vol. 24: Angela Weyer, Ursula Schädler-Saub (ed.): Aus Rot wird Schwarz – und dann? Pigmentveränderungen an Kunst- und Kulturgut. Interdisziplinäre Tagung des Hornemann Instituts der HAWK Hochschule für angewandte Wissenschaft und Kunst Hildesheim/Holzminden/Göttingen anlässlich seines 25-jährigen Jubiläums in Kooperation mit der AG Konservierung – Restaurierung von ICOMOS und dem Verband der Restauratoren e. V., 9. November 2023, Berlin 2024.
