= José Vivas =

Venezuelan architect (1928–2022)

Fruto Vivas
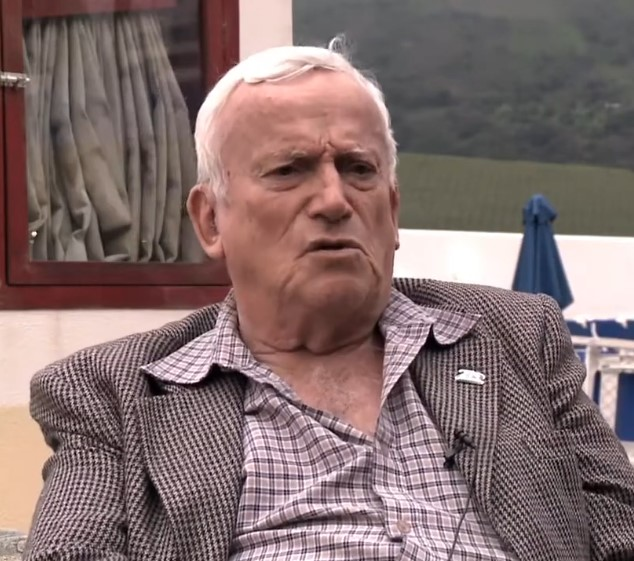
- José Fructoso Vivas
- Born: 21 January 1928; La Grita, Táchira, Venezuela
- Died: 23 August 2022 (aged 94)
- Education: Central University of Venezuela
- Occupation: Architect
- Buildings: Venezuela Pavilion (Expo 2000), Táchira Club, Museum of Modern Art, Caracas, Holy Redeemer Church

José Fructoso Vivas Vivas (21 January 1928 – 23 August 2022), also known as Fruto Vivas, was a Venezuelan architect. His best known works are the Venezuelan Pavilion in Expo Hanover 2000, Táchira Club in Caracas, Venezuela, the Holy Redeemer church in San Cristóbal, Venezuela, and the Museum of Modern Art in Caracas, Venezuela.

== Personal life ==
Vivas was born 21 January 1928 in La Grita, Táchira, Venezuela. At 23, he enrolled to study architecture at the Central University of Venezuela, where he graduated in 1956. Following graduation, he worked with other architects such as Brazilian Oscar Niemeyer and Spaniard Eduardo Torroja. He joined the military political party of Venezuela, where he began to design projects for them and other communist parties.

== Architectural style ==
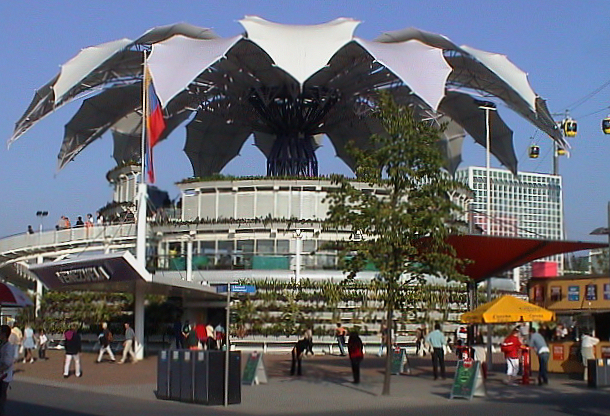
Venezuelan Pavilion in Expo 2000

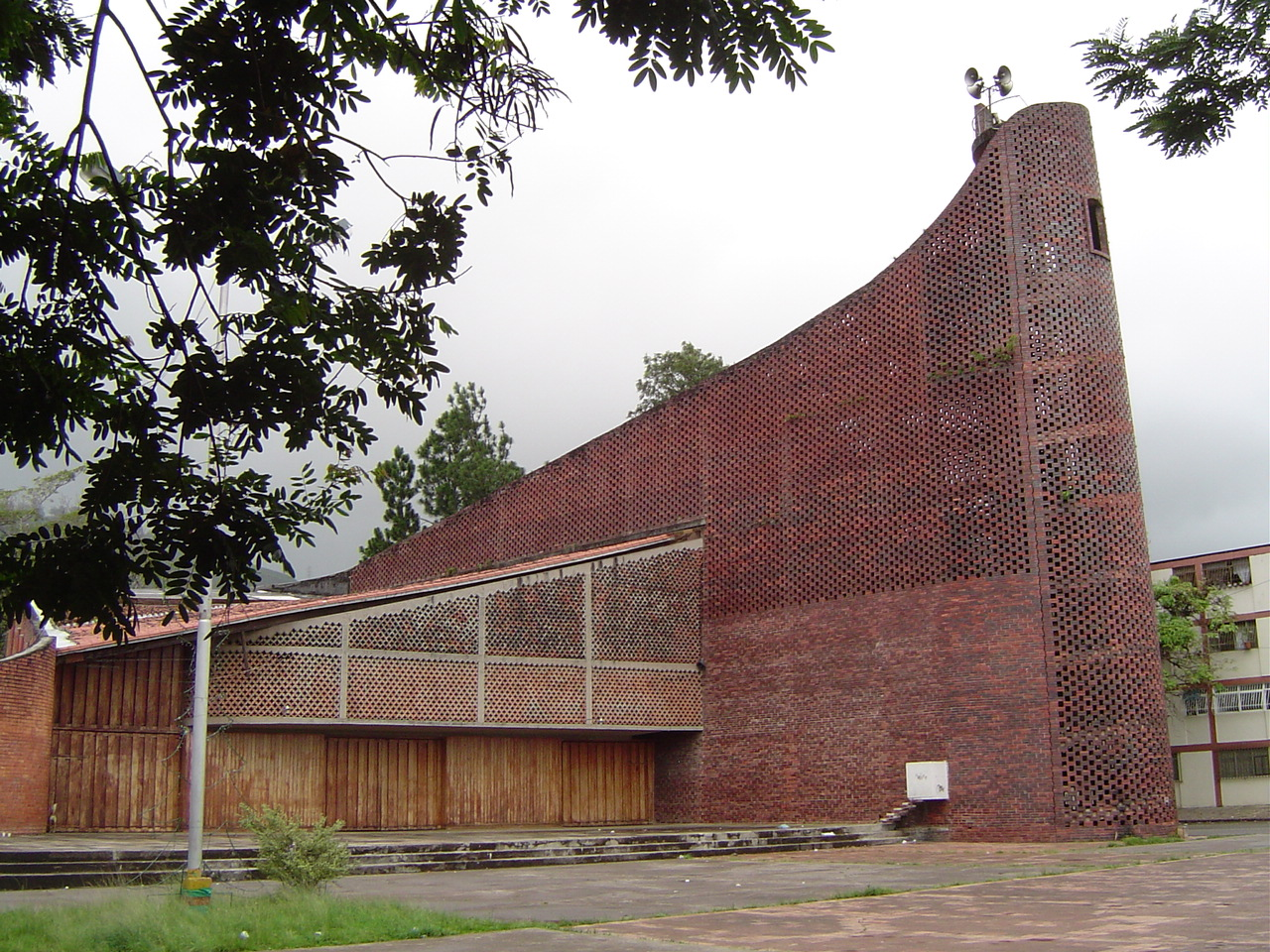
Church of the Divine Redeemer, San Cristóbal, Venezuela

Vivas' architectural style tends to consist of the International Style and modernism, though he varied the two styles via naturalist and humanist influences. His architecture style also utilizes ecology. The best example of his work is the Venezuelan Pavilion in Hannover Expo in 2000; the pavilion is characterized by the shape of the orchid flower, which is fifty-nine feet tall and protrudes from the building with its thirty-foot petals opening and closing depending on the weather.

== Works ==
- Church of Santa Rosa, Valencia, Venezuela (1946)
- Táchira Club, Caracas, Venezuela (1955)
- Moruco Hotel, Mérida, Venezuela (1955)
- Museum of Modern Art, Caracas, Venezuela, worked with architect Oscar Niemeyer (1955)
- Church of the Divine Redeemer, San Cristóbal, Venezuela (1957)
- Church of Zapara Urbanization, Maracaibo, Venezuela (1957)
- La Cumbre Hotel, Ciudad Bolívar, Venezuela (1958)
- Major Square of San Cristobal, Venezuela (1958)
- Trees for Life complex, Lecherias, Venezuela (1994)
- Venezuelan Pavilion in Hannover Expo (2000)
- Project of the NGO headquarters in Santos Brazil Recycled Lives (2011)

== Awards and honorary doctorates ==
- National Award of Architecture in Venezuela (1987)
- Architecture: Central University of Venezuela (2009)
- Architecture: Experimental University of Tachira (2011)
